

4001–4100 

|-
| 4001 Ptolemaeus || 1949 PV || Ptolemy  (c. AD 100–170), Greek astronomer || 
|-id=002
| 4002 Shinagawa || 1950 JB || Seishi Shinagawa  (born 1944), first to use electronic computers for orbit computation in Japan || 
|-id=003
| 4003 Schumann || 1964 ED || Robert Schumann (1810–1856), German composer || 
|-id=004
| 4004 Listʹev ||  || Vladislav Listyev (1956–1995), a Russian television journalist who was murdered || 
|-id=005
| 4005 Dyagilev ||  || Sergei Diaghilev (1872–1929), Russian impresario || 
|-id=006
| 4006 Sandler || 1972 YR || Grigori Sandler (1912–1994), a Russian musician || 
|-id=007
| 4007 Euryalos || 1973 SR || Euryalos, mythical Greek warrior || 
|-id=008
| 4008 Corbin || 1977 BY || Thomas E. Corbin, American astronomer, and his wife Brenda Corbin, Librarian, both at the US Naval Observatory || 
|-id=009
| 4009 Drobyshevskij ||  || Edward Drobyshevski (1936–2012), Russian astro- and plasma physicist at Ioffe Institute in St. Petersburg || 
|-id=010
| 4010 Nikolʹskij ||  || Gennady Nikolsky (1929–1982), Soviet solar astronomer || 
|-id=011
| 4011 Bakharev ||  || Anatoly Bakharev (1918–1979), observer and researcher on comets and meteors. He is one of the co-discoverers of near-parabolic comet C/1955 N1 (Bakharev-Macfarlane-Krienke) || 
|-id=012
| 4012 Geballe ||  || Tom Geballe (born 1944), American astronomer || 
|-id=013
| 4013 Ogiria ||  || Maiya Borisovna Ogir' (1933–1991), Russian solar physicist || 
|-id=014
| 4014 Heizman ||  || Leonie and Charles Heizman from San Juan Capistrano, California, who hosted the discoverer Nikolai Chernykh during the conference on Near Earth Asteroids in 1991 || 
|-id=015
| 4015 Wilson-Harrington || 1979 VA || American co-discoverers Albert G. Wilson (1918–2012) and Robert G. Harrington (1904–1987) || 
|-id=016
| 4016 Sambre || 1979 XK || The Sambre River, France and Belgium || 
|-id=017
| 4017 Disneya ||  || Walt Disney (1901–1966), American animator || 
|-id=018
| 4018 Bratislava || 1980 YM || Bratislava, capital city of Slovakia || 
|-id=019
| 4019 Klavetter ||  || James Jay Klavetter (1960–1997), professor of physics at California State University, Sacramento || 
|-id=020
| 4020 Dominique ||  || Dominique Bockelée-Morvan (born 1957), researcher at the Paris Observatory, France || 
|-id=021
| 4021 Dancey ||  || Roy Dancey and Bruce D. Dancey, father and son, both Canadian designers of telescope mirrors || 
|-id=022
| 4022 Nonna ||  || Nonna Mordyukova (1925–2008), Soviet actress || 
|-id=023
| 4023 Jarník || 1981 UN || Vojtěch Jarník (1897–1970), Czech mathematician || 
|-id=024
| 4024 Ronan || 1981 WQ || Colin Ronan (1920–1995), author and writer on astronomy || 
|-id=025
| 4025 Ridley || 1981 WU || Harold B. Ridley, British astrophotographer || 
|-id=026
| 4026 Beet ||  || Ernest Agar Beet, teacher and amateur astronomer || 
|-id=027
| 4027 Mitton || 1982 DN || Simon Mitton (born 1946), British astronomer and author || 
|-id=028
| 4028 Pancratz ||  || Chris Pancratz (1950–2003), formerly of the National Space Society || 
|-id=029
| 4029 Bridges ||  || Patricia M. Bridges, planetary cartographer with the U.S. Geological Survey || 
|-id=030
| 4030 Archenhold ||  || Friedrich Simon Archenhold (1861–1939), a German astronomer and the first director the Archenhold Observatory in Berlin, who, in 1896, made it possible to build the world's longest refractor telescope with a focal length of 21 meters. The telescope was originally known as the Great Treptow Refractor. || 
|-id=031
| 4031 Mueller || 1985 CL || Jean Mueller (born 1950), American astronomer and discoverer of comets, minor planets, and supernovae. The first woman to operate the historic Hooker telescope at Mount Wilson Observatory, and was the first woman hired as a telescope operator at Palomar Observatory in 1985. || 
|-id=032
| 4032 Chaplygin ||  || Sergey Chaplygin (1869–1942), Russian and Soviet physicist and one of the founders of the aerodynamics || 
|-id=033
| 4033 Yatsugatake || 1986 FA || Mount Yatsugatake, one of Japan's 100 famous mountains || 
|-id=034
| 4034 Vishnu || 1986 PA || Vishnu is the Hindu god of preservation || 
|-id=035
| 4035 Thestor || 1986 WD || Thestor was a grandson of Apollo and the father of Kalchas. || 
|-id=036
| 4036 Whitehouse ||  || David Robert Whitehouse (born 1956), British science journalist and BBC Online's Science Editor, recipient of the European Internet Journalist of the Year award in 2002 || 
|-id=037
| 4037 Ikeya || 1987 EC || Kaoru Ikeya (born 1943), Japanese amateur astronomer || 
|-id=038
| 4038 Kristina ||  || Kristina Leterme, Dutch literature professor and partner of the discoverer || 
|-id=039
| 4039 Souseki || 1987 SH || Natsume Sōseki (1867–1916), Japanese novelist || 
|-id=040
| 4040 Purcell ||  || Henry Purcell (1659–1695), English composer || 
|-id=041
| 4041 Miyamotoyohko ||  || Yohko Miyamoto (born 1922) wife of Japanese astronomer, Yukio (or Sachio) Miyamoto || 
|-id=042
| 4042 Okhotsk ||  || Sea of Okhotsk, between Japan and Russia || 
|-id=043
| 4043 Perolof || 1175 T-3 || Per Olof Lindblad, Swedish astronomer, director of the Stockholm Observatory, and son of Bertil Lindblad (1895–1965) || 
|-id=044
| 4044 Erikhøg || 5142 T-3 || Erik Høg (born 1932), Danish astronomer at the Copenhagen Observatory || 
|-id=045
| 4045 Lowengrub || 1953 RG || Morton Lowengrub, American mathematician and forerunner of the WIYN Observatory at Kitt Peak, Arizona || 
|-id=046
| 4046 Swain || 1953 TV || Joseph Swain (1857–1927), professor of mathematics at and president of Indiana University || 
|-id=047
| 4047 Chang'E ||  || The Chinese moon goddess, Chang'e, and the Chinese lunar probe launched in 2007, initiating the Chinese Lunar Exploration Program || 
|-id=048
| 4048 Samwestfall || 1964 UC || Richard S. Westfall (1924–1996), American historian of science || 
|-id=049
| 4049 Noragalʹ ||  || Nora Galʹ (1912–1991), Soviet literary translator || 
|-id=050
| 4050 Mebailey || 1976 SF || Mark Edward Bailey, British astronomer || 
|-id=051
| 4051 Hatanaka || 1978 VP || Takeo Hatanaka (1914–1963), Japanese astronomer || 
|-id=052
| 4052 Crovisier ||  || Jacques Crovisier (born 1948), French astronomer || 
|-id=053
| 4053 Cherkasov ||  || Nikolay Cherkasov (1903–1966), Soviet actor || 
|-id=054
| 4054 Turnov || 1983 TL || Turnov, Czech Republic || 
|-id=055
| 4055 Magellan ||  || Ferdinand Magellan (c. 1480–1521), Portuguese explorer || 
|-id=056
| 4056 Timwarner ||  || Timothy Warner (1961–1990), chief mission planner for the Diffuse Infrared Background Experiment || 
|-id=057
| 4057 Demophon || 1985 TQ || Demophon, mythical king of Athens || 
|-id=058
| 4058 Cecilgreen || 1986 JV || Cecil Howard Green (1900–2003), British geophysicist, co-founder of Texas Instruments and philanthropist extraordinary || 
|-id=059
| 4059 Balder ||  || Balder, Norse god || 
|-id=060
| 4060 Deipylos ||  || Deipylos, mythical Greek hero || 
|-id=061
| 4061 Martelli ||  || Giuseppe Martelli, Italian architect and engineer || 
|-id=062
| 4062 Schiaparelli || 1989 BF || Giovanni Schiaparelli (1835–1910), Italian astronomer best known for his telescopic observations of Mars || 
|-id=063
| 4063 Euforbo ||  || Euphorbus (Euforbo), the Greek hero of the Trojan War, who wounded Patroclus in the breast before being killed by Hektor. || 
|-id=064
| 4064 Marjorie || 2126 P-L || Marjorie Meinel (1922–2008), American astronomer || 
|-id=065
| 4065 Meinel || 2820 P-L || Aden Meinel (1922–2011), American astronomer || 
|-id=066
| 4066 Haapavesi || 1940 RG || Haapavesi, Finland, birthplace of the discoverer's father || 
|-id=067
| 4067 Mikhelʹson || 1966 TP || Nikolaj Mikhelʹson (born 1918), outstanding Soviet scientist and optician of telescopes || 
|-id=068
| 4068 Menestheus || 1973 SW || Menestheus, mythical king of Athens || 
|-id=069
| 4069 Blakee ||  || Lawrence E. Blakee, observatory assistant || 
|-id=070
| 4070 Rozov ||  || Victor Sergeevich Rozov (born 1913), Russian playwright || 
|-id=071
| 4071 Rostovdon ||  || Rostov-on-Don, Russia, the discoverer's birthplace || 
|-id=072
| 4072 Yayoi ||  || Yayoi period in prehistoric Japan from 300 BC–300 AD during the Iron Age || 
|-id=073
| 4073 Ruianzhongxue ||  || Ruianzhongxue (Ruian Middle School), Zhejiang, China, 110-year-old school of mathematics || 
|-id=074
| 4074 Sharkov ||  || Viktor Sharkov (born 1935), an experimental astrophysicist at Ioffe Institute in St Petersburg, Russia || 
|-id=075
| 4075 Sviridov ||  || Georgy Sviridov (1915–1998), Russian composer || 
|-id=076
| 4076 Dörffel ||  || Georg Samuel Dörffel (1643–1688), German pastor and astronomer || 
|-id=077
| 4077 Asuka ||  || Asuka period, from 6th century to 8th in Japan || 
|-id=078
| 4078 Polakis || 1983 AC || Thomas A. Polakis (born 1961), an American mechanical engineer, friend of the discoverer Brian A. Skiff, and amateur astronomer at the Command Module Observatory  in Arizona (Src, Src). || 
|-id=079
| 4079 Britten || 1983 CS || Benjamin Britten (1913–1976), Baron Britten, British composer || 
|-id=080
| 4080 Galinskij || 1983 PW || Nikolaj Galinskij, Soviet radio engineer || 
|-id=081
| 4081 Tippett ||  || Michael Tippett (1905–1998), British composer || 
|-id=082
| 4082 Swann ||  || Gordon A. Swann, American geologist, principal investigator for the geological field investigations conducted at the Apollo 14 and 15 lunar landing sites || 
|-id=083
| 4083 Jody || 1985 CV || Joan D. Swann, planetary data librarian with the U.S. Geological Survey || 
|-id=084
| 4084 Hollis || 1985 GM || Andrew J. Hollis, British astronomer || 
|-id=085
| 4085 Weir || 1985 JR || Doris Blackman Weir, geologist with the U.S. Geological Survey || 
|-id=086
| 4086 Podalirius ||  || Podalirius, mythical Greek warrior || 
|-id=087
| 4087 Pärt ||  || Arvo Pärt (born 1935), Estonian composer || 
|-id=088
| 4088 Baggesen || 1986 GG || Jens Baggesen (1764–1826), Danish poet and satirist || 
|-id=089
| 4089 Galbraith || 1986 JG || John Kenneth Galbraith (1908–2006), Canadian-born, American economist and polemicist || 
|-id=090
| 4090 Říšehvězd ||  || Říše hvězd, Czech astronomy journal || 
|-id=091
| 4091 Lowe ||  || Andrew Lowe (born 1959), Canadian geophysicist and amateur astronomer || 
|-id=092
| 4092 Tyr ||  || Tyr, Norse god || 
|-id=093
| 4093 Bennett || 1986 VD || Jack C. Bennett, South African amateur astronomer || 
|-id=094
| 4094 Aoshima || 1987 QC || Masaki Aoshima  (1947–1987), Japanese amateur astronomer || 
|-id=095
| 4095 Ishizuchisan || 1987 SG || Ishizuchisan, mountain in Ehime, Japan || 
|-id=096
| 4096 Kushiro || 1987 VC || Kushiro, city in Japan || 
|-id=097
| 4097 Tsurugisan || 1987 WW || Tsurugisan, mountain in Tokushima, Japan || 
|-id=098
| 4098 Thraen ||  || Anton Thraen (1843–1902), German amateur astronomer and Catholic priest || 
|-id=099
| 4099 Wiggins ||  || Patrick Wiggins (born 1949), American astronomy educator at the Hansen Planetarium (1975–2001) in Salt Lake City, UT. Currently NASA/JPL Solar System Ambassador || 
|-id=100
| 4100 Sumiko || 1988 BF || Sumiko Hioki (born 1965), wife Japanese co-discoverer Tsutomu Hioki || 
|}

4101–4200 

|-
| 4101 Ruikou || 1988 CE || Ruikou Kuroiwa (1862–1920), Japanese writer || 
|-id=102
| 4102 Gergana ||  || Gergana Georgieva Gelkova (born 2000) is the adorable grandniece of the discoverer. The name also honors the discoverer's parents, combining their first names Georgy and Ana || 
|-id=103
| 4103 Chahine || 1989 EB || Moustafa Chahine, (1935–2011) Lebanese-American scientist, chief scientist for NASA JPL || 
|-id=104
| 4104 Alu || 1989 ED || Jeff Alu (born 1966), American amateur astronomer and discoverer of minor planets who participated in the Palomar Planet-Crossing Asteroid Survey. He is a musician and composer. || 
|-id=105
| 4105 Tsia || 1989 EK || Zia sun symbol used by the Zia people in New Mexico || 
|-id=106
| 4106 Nada || 1989 EW || Nada Junior and Senior High School, in Kobe, Japan || 
|-id=107
| 4107 Rufino || 1989 GT || Rufus J. Walker, supporter of the U.S. space program and friend of American discoverer, Eleanor F. Helin || 
|-id=108
| 4108 Rakos || 3439 T-3 || Karl D. Rakos (born 1925),  Croatian-born Austrian astronomer who was professor of astronomy at the University of Vienna and a director of the Vienna Observatory || 
|-id=109
| 4109 Anokhin || 1969 OW || Sergei Anokhin (1910–1986), Russian test pilot and cosmonaut-select || 
|-id=110
| 4110 Keats || 1977 CZ || John Keats (1795–1821), English romantic poet || 
|-id=111
| 4111 Lamy ||  || Philippe Louis Lamy, French-born American astronomer at Laboratoire d'Astronomie Spatiale, Marseilles || 
|-id=112
| 4112 Hrabal || 1981 ST || Bohumil Hrabal (1914–1997), Czech writer || 
|-id=113
| 4113 Rascana || 1982 BQ || Royal Astronomical Society of Canada || 
|-id=114
| 4114 Jasnorzewska ||  || Maria Pawlikowska-Jasnorzewska (1891–1945), Polish poet || 
|-id=115
| 4115 Peternorton ||  || Peter Norton (born 1943), American software engineer || 
|-id=116
| 4116 Elachi || 1982 SU || Charles Elachi (born 1947), Lebanese-American electrical engineering and planetary science at Caltech || 
|-id=117
| 4117 Wilke ||  || Alfred Wilke (1893–1972), German optician || 
|-id=118
| 4118 Sveta ||  || Svetlana Savitskaya (born 1948), Russian cosmonaut who became the second woman in space  in 1982 || 
|-id=119
| 4119 Miles || 1983 BE || Howard G. Miles, member of the Order of the British Empire and director of the Artificial Satellite Section of the British Astronomical Association || 
|-id=120
| 4120 Denoyelle ||  || Jozef Denoyelle (born 1937), Belgian astronomer || 
|-id=121
| 4121 Carlin || 1986 JH || Carlin Singer-Brewster, daughter of Stephen Singer-Brewster, an American astronomer and discoverer of minor planets || 
|-id=122
| 4122 Ferrari || 1986 OA || Enzo Ferrari (1898–1988), Italian builder of racing cars and sports cars || 
|-id=123
| 4123 Tarsila ||  || Tarsila do Amaral (1886–1973), Brazilian modernist painter || 
|-id=124
| 4124 Herriot || 1986 SE || James Herriot (1916–1995), British writer and veterinary surgeon || 
|-id=125
| 4125 Lew Allen || 1987 MO || Lew Allen (1925–2010), American physicist, director of the Jet Propulsion Laboratory and a United States Air Force four-star general || 
|-id=126
| 4126 Mashu || 1988 BU || Lake Mashū, a crater lake in Akan National Park on the island of Hokkaidō, Japan. || 
|-id=127
| 4127 Kyogoku ||  || Kyōgoku, town in Japan || 
|-id=128
| 4128 UKSTU ||  || UK Schmidt Telescope Unit at the Royal Observatory Edinburgh and the 1.2-m U.K. Schmidt Telescope at the Siding Spring Observatory in Australia || 
|-id=129
| 4129 Richelen || 1988 DM || Richard A. Keen and Helen C. Duran, friends of the discoverer, Robert H. McNaught || 
|-id=130
| 4130 Ramanujan ||  || Srinivasa Ramanujan (1887–1920), Indian mathematician || 
|-id=131
| 4131 Stasik ||  || John S. Stasik, American educator || 
|-id=132
| 4132 Bartók || 1988 EH || Béla Bartók (1881–1945), Austro-Hungarian composer || 
|-id=133
| 4133 Heureka || 1942 DB || Heureka, science center in Vantaa, Finland, north of Helsinki || 
|-id=134
| 4134 Schütz || 1961 CR || Heinrich Schütz (1585–1672), German composer and organist of the 17th century || 
|-id=135
| 4135 Svetlanov || 1966 PG || Yevgeny Svetlanov (1928–2002), Soviet-Russian conductor || 
|-id=136
| 4136 Artmane || 1968 FJ || Vija Artmane (1929–2008), Latvian actress || 
|-id=137
| 4137 Crabtree || 1970 WC || William Crabtree (1610–1644), an astronomer, mathematician, and cloth merchant in Salford, near Manchester, second person to knowingly observe a transit of Venus, in 1639 || 
|-id=138
| 4138 Kalchas || 1973 SM || Calchas, mythical person related to Trojan War || 
|-id=139
| 4139 Ulʹyanin ||  || Sergej Alekseevich Ulʹyanin (1871–1921), Russian pilot and inventor of new airplane designs || 
|-id=140
| 4140 Branham || 1976 VA || Richard L. Branham Jr (born 1943), American astronomer at U.S. Naval Observatory and director of the Yale-Columbia Southern Station at Leoncito Astronomical Complex || 
|-id=141
| 4141 Nintanlena ||  || Nina, Tanya and Elena, wife and daughters of Kiev astronomer Klim Churyumov (1937–2016) || 
|-id=142
| 4142 Dersu-Uzala || 1981 KE || Dersu Uzala, character in eponymous novel by Vladimir Arsenyev || 
|-id=143
| 4143 Huziak ||  || Richard Huziak (born 1957), Canadian amateur astronomer || 
|-id=144
| 4144 Vladvasilʹev ||  || Vladimir Vasiliev (born 1940), Russian ballet dancer and choreographer || 
|-id=145
| 4145 Maximova ||  || Ekaterina Maximova (1939–2009), Soviet and Russian ballet dancer || 
|-id=146
| 4146 Rudolfinum ||  || The Rudolfinum, important building in Prague || 
|-id=147
| 4147 Lennon || 1983 AY || John Lennon (1940–1980), member of the Beatles || 
|-id=148
| 4148 McCartney || 1983 NT || Paul McCartney (born 1942), member of the Beatles || 
|-id=149
| 4149 Harrison || 1984 EZ || George Harrison (1943–2001), member of the Beatles || 
|-id=150
| 4150 Starr ||  || Ringo Starr (born 1940), member of the Beatles || 
|-id=151
| 4151 Alanhale ||  || Alan Hale (born 1958), American astronomer who  co-discovered Comet Hale–Bopp || 
|-id=152
| 4152 Weber || 1985 JF || Carl Maria von Weber (1786–1826), German composer || 
|-id=153
| 4153 Roburnham ||  || Robert Burnham Jr. (1931–1993), American astronomer, author, and senior editor of Astronomy magazine. He is a discoverer of minor planets and comets. || 
|-id=154
| 4154 Rumsey || 1985 NE || Norman Rumsey (1922–2007), a New Zealand astronomer and optical designer || 
|-id=155
| 4155 Watanabe ||  || Kazuro Watanabe (born 1955), Japanese amateur astronomer and discoverer of minor planets || 
|-id=156
| 4156 Okadanoboru || 1988 BE || Noboru Okada (1953–2002), Japanese adventurer, photographer, mountain-climber and amateur astronomer || 
|-id=157
| 4157 Izu ||  || Izu Peninsula, Japan || 
|-id=158
| 4158 Santini || 1989 BE || Giovanni Santini (1786–1877), Italian astronomer and director of the Padua Observatory  and author of textbook Elementi di Astronomia || 
|-id=159
| 4159 Freeman || 1989 GK || Ann Freeman, executive secretary of the Seismological Laboratory of the California Institute of Technology, supporter of the Palomar Planet-Crossing Asteroid Survey and friend of discoverer Eleanor F. Helin || 
|-id=160
| 4160 Sabrina-John || 1989 LE || Sabrina M. Gonsalves  (1962–1980) and John H. Riggins (1962–1980) in memory of the young couple || 
|-id=161
| 4161 Amasis || 6627 P-L || Amasis II (Amasis), Egyptian pharaoh || 
|-id=162
| 4162 SAF || 1940 WA || Société Astronomique de France, the French Astronomical Society || 
|-id=163
| 4163 Saaremaa || 1941 HC || Saaremaa island, Estonia || 
|-id=164
| 4164 Shilov || 1969 UR || Alexandr Shilov (born 1943), Soviet-Russian painter || 
|-id=165
| 4165 Didkovskij ||  || Leonid Vladimirovich Didkovskij (born 1948), astrophysicist and deputy director of the Crimean Astrophysical Observatory, who developed scientific instrumentation for the Soviet space telescope Astron || 
|-id=166
| 4166 Pontryagin ||  || Lev Pontryagin (1908–1988), Russian mathematician || 
|-id=167
| 4167 Riemann ||  || Bernhard Riemann (1826–1866), German mathematician || 
|-id=168
| 4168 Millan || 1979 EE || Julio Rodolfo Millan (1923–1995), first rector of the National University of San Juan in Argentina, where the old Yale-Columbia Southern Station was located at the time || 
|-id=169
| 4169 Celsius ||  || Anders Celsius (1701–1744), Swedish physicist and astronomer, after whom the Celsius temperature scale was named || 
|-id=170
| 4170 Semmelweis || 1980 PT || Ignaz Semmelweis (1818–1865), German-Hungarian physician and an early pioneer of antiseptic procedures || 
|-id=171
| 4171 Carrasco ||  || Juan Carrasco, senior night assistant and operator of the Hale Telescope at the Palomar Observatory in California || 
|-id=172
| 4172 Rochefort ||  || The town of Rochefort in Belgium || 
|-id=173
| 4173 Thicksten ||  || Robert P. Thicksten, superintendent of Palomar Observatory || 
|-id=174
| 4174 Pikulia ||  || Valentin Pikul (1928–1990), Soviet historical novelist || 
|-id=175
| 4175 Billbaum || 1985 GX || William A. Baum (1924–2012), American astronomer Src || 
|-id=176
| 4176 Sudek || 1987 DS || Josef Sudek (1896–1976), outstanding Czech photographer || 
|-id=177
| 4177 Kohman ||  || Truman Paul Kohman (1916–2010), was an emeritus professor of nuclear chemistry at Carnegie-Mellon University, who co-discovered aluminium-26, an isotope that has given important information about meteorites and the early history of the Solar System. Kohman was also an ardent amateur astronomer and teacher. He coined the word "nuclide". || 
|-id=178
| 4178 Mimeev ||  || Alexandr Pavlovich Mimeev (born 1951), Russian radio engineer and amateur astronomer || 
|-id=179
| 4179 Toutatis || 1989 AC || Toutatis, Celtic god || 
|-id=180
| 4180 Anaxagoras || 6092 P-L || Anaxagoras (c. 510–428 BC), Greek philosopher || 
|-id=181
| 4181 Kivi ||  || Aleksis Kivi (1834–1872), the first Finnish-language dramatist and novelist || 
|-id=182
| 4182 Mount Locke || 1951 JQ || Mount Locke, one of two mountains atop which the McDonald Observatory facilities are located || 
|-id=183
| 4183 Cuno || 1959 LM || Cuno Hoffmeister (1892–1968), German astronomer and a discoverer of minor planets, comets and variable stars, who discovered this Apollo asteroid || 
|-id=184
| 4184 Berdyayev ||  || Nikolai Berdyaev (1874–1948), Russian philosopher || 
|-id=185
| 4185 Phystech || 1975 ED || Moscow Institute of Physics and Technology (Phystech) || 
|-id=186
| 4186 Tamashima ||  || Tamashima, a town of Kurashiki, Okayama, Japan || 
|-id=187
| 4187 Shulnazaria ||  || Leonid Markovich Shul'man and Galina Kirillovna Nazarchuk, couple of astronomers, researchers on comets, and staff members of the Main Ukrainian Astronomical Observatory at Golosseevo, near Kiev || 
|-id=188
| 4188 Kitezh ||  || Kitezh, phantom city of Russian folklore || 
|-id=189
| 4189 Sayany ||  || The Sayan Mountains, a mountain chain in southern Siberia, Russia || 
|-id=190
| 4190 Kvasnica || 1980 JH || Jozef Kvasnica (1930–1992), Czech physicist || 
|-id=191
| 4191 Assesse || 1980 KH || The Belgian village of Assesse, birthplace of the father of the discoverer, Henri Debehogne || 
|-id=192
| 4192 Breysacher || 1981 DH || Jacques Breysacher, French astronomer || 
|-id=193
| 4193 Salanave ||  || Leon E. Salanave, originally a meteorologist, as first executive officer of the Astronomical Society of the Pacific and first editor of Mercury, he took steps to ensure that amateur astronomers felt a sense of "belonging" to an organization dominated by professionals. || 
|-id=194
| 4194 Sweitzer || 1982 RE || Paul A. Sweitzer (born 1936), American reporter || 
|-id=195
| 4195 Esambaev ||  || Makhmud Alisultanovich Esambayev (1924–2000), a Chechen folk dancer || 
|-id=196
| 4196 Shuya ||  || The Russian town of Shuya, Ivanovo Oblast || 
|-id=197
| 4197 Morpheus || 1982 TA || Morpheus, the a god of dreams who appears in Ovid's "Metamorphoses" || 
|-id=198
| 4198 Panthera ||  || Panthera, Latin word for panther || 
|-id=199
| 4199 Andreev ||  || Gennadij Andreev (and his family), a professor of celestial mechanics at the University of Tomsk. He has led several expeditions to the site of the Tunguska event || 
|-id=200
| 4200 Shizukagozen || 1983 WA || Shizuka Gozen (1165–1211), Japanese mistress of Minamoto no Yoshitsune || 
|}

4201–4300 

|-
| 4201 Orosz ||  || Elizabeth M. Orosz (born 1970), staff member at the Melton Memorial Observatory and friend of discoverer Brian Skiff || 
|-id=202
| 4202 Minitti ||  || Michelle Minitti (born 1973), American areological mineralogist at Arizona State University who studies the mineralogy of Mars. She has identified a new hematite formation mechanism for Mars. || 
|-id=203
| 4203 Brucato ||  || Robert Joseph Brucato, American astronomer and assistant director of the Palomar Observatory || 
|-id=204
| 4204 Barsig ||  || Walter Barsig, German science teacher and director of the Annual Cultural Festival of the Ries of Nordlingen and a state school board in Bavaria, Germany || 
|-id=205
| 4205 David Hughes || 1985 YP || David Hughes (born 1941), British astronomer and professor of astronomy at the University of Sheffield || 
|-id=206
| 4206 Verulamium || 1986 QL || Verulamium is an ancient British Roman city, now St Albans, Hertfordshire || 
|-id=207
| 4207 Chernova ||  || Galina Pavlovna Chernova, a researcher at the Astrophysical Institute of the Tajik Academy of Sciences, Dushanbe || 
|-id=208
| 4208 Kiselev ||  || Nikolaj Nikolaevich Kiselev, department head of the Astrophysical Institute of the Tajik Academy of Sciences, Dushanbe || 
|-id=209
| 4209 Briggs ||  || Geoffrey A. Briggs, American space physicist and director of the Solar System Exploration Division at NASA Headquarters during the 1980s || 
|-id=210
| 4210 Isobelthompson ||  || Isobel Thompson, British archaeologist and co-author of Alban's Buried Towns: An Assessment of St. Albans' Archaeology up to A.D. 1600 || 
|-id=211
| 4211 Rosniblett || 1987 RT || Rosalind Niblett, British archaeologist and co-author of Alban's Buried Towns: An Assessment of St. Albans' Archaeology up to A.D. 1600 || 
|-id=212
| 4212 Sansyu-Asuke ||  || Japanese town of Asuke, Aichi. The discovering Toyota Observatory  is located nearby in Toyota. || 
|-id=213
| 4213 Njord ||  || Njord, Norse god of winds, navigation and prosperity || 
|-id=214
| 4214 Veralynn ||  || Vera Lynn (born 1917), British singer, famous during World War II || 
|-id=215
| 4215 Kamo ||  || Akira Kamo (born 1943), Japanese amateur astronomer who founded the Comet Observers Network (Hoshi no Hiroba) in 1968 || 
|-id=216
| 4216 Neunkirchen ||  || Neunkirchen, town in Austria || 
|-id=217
| 4217 Engelhardt ||  || Wolf von Engelhardt (1910–2008), German meteorite researcher || 
|-id=218
| 4218 Demottoni ||  || Glauco de Mottoni y Palacios (1901–1988), an Italian electrotechnical engineer and amateur astronomer || 
|-id=219
| 4219 Nakamura || 1988 DB || Giichi Nakamura, founder of an optical instruments factory, Mitaka Kohki, Japan || 
|-id=220
| 4220 Flood || 1988 DN || Thomas Flood (1919–1988), Scottish amateur astronomer, member of the British Astronomical Association and co-founder of the Dundee Astronomical Society in 1955 || 
|-id=221
| 4221 Picasso || 1988 EJ || Pablo Picasso (1881–1973), Spanish artist || 
|-id=222
| 4222 Nancita ||  || Nancy Coker Helin, daughter-in-law of the discoverer Eleanor F. Helin || 
|-id=223
| 4223 Shikoku || 1988 JM || Shikoku, Japan || 
|-id=224
| 4224 Susa || 1988 KG || Susan and Sarah Hicks, daughters of Bill and Nancy Hicks enthusiast of space-related research (acquainted with discoverer E. F. Helin) || 
|-id=225
| 4225 Hobart || 1989 BN || Joseph R. Hobart (born 1944) is an electrical engineer, amateur radio operator W7LUX, and minor-planet and variable-star observer. As of March 2011 he has improved the orbits of more than 700 minor planets, many of which were in danger of loss, and discovered 80 minor planets including NEO  || 
|-id=226
| 4226 Damiaan || 1989 RE || Father Damien (1840–1889), Belgian priest || 
|-id=227
| 4227 Kaali || 1942 DC || Kaali crater, Estonia || 
|-id=228
| 4228 Nemiro ||  || Andrej Nemiro (1909–1995), Russian astronomer at Pulkovo Observatory || 
|-id=229
| 4229 Plevitskaya || 1971 BK || Nadezhda Plevitskaya (1884–1940), popular female Russian singer (and a Soviet agent) || 
|-id=230
| 4230 van den Bergh ||  || Sidney van den Bergh (born 1929), Dutch-born Canadian astronomer || 
|-id=231
| 4231 Fireman || 1976 WD || Edward Fireman (1922–1990), American planetary geologist and physicist at the Harvard-Smithsonian Center for Astrophysics, known for his measurements of radioactive isotopes to determine the cosmic-ray exposure ages of freshly fallen meteorites || 
|-id=232
| 4232 Aparicio || 1977 CD || Emiliano Pedro Aparicio (1921–1988), mineralogist and geologist at the National University of Cuyo and the National University of San Juan || 
|-id=233
| 4233 Palʹchikov ||  || Nikolaj Borisovich Palʹchikov (1913–1937), a student in the astronomy department at Leningrad University who was killed during one of Stalin's purges || 
|-id=234
| 4234 Evtushenko ||  || Yevgeny Yevtushenko (1933–2017), Russian poet || 
|-id=235
| 4235 Tatishchev ||  || Vasily Tatishchev (1686–1750), Russian statesman, historian and ethnographer || 
|-id=236
| 4236 Lidov ||  || Mikhail Lidov (1926–1993), Soviet–Russian astronomer best known for the Kozai-Lidov mechanism || 
|-id=237
| 4237 Raushenbakh ||  || Boris Rauschenbach (1915–2001), Russian space scientist || 
|-id=238
| 4238 Audrey || 1980 GF || Audrey Hepburn (1929–1993), actress, born in Brussels, Belgium, to an English father and Dutch mother (a baroness) || 
|-id=239
| 4239 Goodman || 1980 OE || Neville J. Goodman, a member of the British Astronomical Association || 
|-id=240
| 4240 Grün ||  || Eberhard Grün (born 1942), German astronomer || 
|-id=241
| 4241 Pappalardo ||  || Neil Pappalardo, pioneer in medical information technology, founder of Meditech and supporter of the Magellan Telescopes || 
|-id=242
| 4242 Brecher || 1981 FQ || Aviva Brecher and Kenneth Brecher, American astronomers and staff members at MIT || 
|-id=243
| 4243 Nankivell ||  || Garry Nankivell (born 1929), New Zealand optician who produced the optics of the 1-meter McLellan Telescope at the Mount John University Observatory, New Zealand || 
|-id=244
| 4244 Zakharchenko ||  || Vasilij Dmitrievich Zakharchenko (1915–1999), a Russian journalist and writer || 
|-id=245
| 4245 Nairc ||  || The Nanjing Astronomical Instrument Research Center (NAIRC) of Chinese Academy of Sciences, founded in 1958. || 
|-id=246
| 4246 Telemann ||  || Georg Philipp Telemann (1681–1767), German composer || 
|-id=247
| 4247 Grahamsmith || 1983 WC || Francis Graham-Smith (born 1923), British astronomer, former Astronomer Royal || 
|-id=248
| 4248 Ranald || 1984 HX || Ranald McIntosh (born 1933), programmer, who maintains the database for the Variable Star Section of the Royal Astronomical Society of New Zealand || 
|-id=249
| 4249 Křemže ||  || Křemže, Czech Republic || 
|-id=250
| 4250 Perun || 1984 UG || Perun, Slavic god of thunder || 
|-id=251
| 4251 Kavasch ||  || Julius Kavasch (1920–1978) and son, Wulf-Dietrich Kavasch, both German amateur geologists and popular science writers about the impact crater in the Nördlinger Ries in western Bavaria, Germany || 
|-id=252
| 4252 Godwin ||  || Richard Godwin (born 1952), American board member of the Space Frontier Foundation, brother of Robert Godwin, space expert and space-history researcher || 
|-id=253
| 4253 Märker ||  || Wolfgang Märker, a German long-time supporter of geological research. His factory is located on the edge of the Ries impact crater, known as Nördlinger Ries. It is one of the world's best studied impact craters. || 
|-id=254
| 4254 Kamél ||  || Lars Kamél (born 1960), Swedish astronomer || 
|-id=255
| 4255 Spacewatch || 1986 GW || The Spacewatch project || 
|-id=256
| 4256 Kagamigawa || 1986 TX || Kagami River, Japan || 
|-id=257
| 4257 Ubasti || 1987 QA || Ubasti Egyptian goddess of feline || 
|-id=258
| 4258 Ryazanov ||  || Eldar Ryazanov (1927–2015), a Soviet movie producer, writer and poet || 
|-id=259
| 4259 McCoy ||  || Timothy James McCoy (born 1964), American planetary geologist and curator of the national meteorite collection at the National Museum of Natural History in Washington || 
|-id=260
| 4260 Yanai || 1989 AX || Masayuki Yanai (born 1959), Japanese amateur astronomer and discoverer of minor planets || 
|-id=261
| 4261 Gekko || 1989 BJ || Gekko Observatory, Japan || 
|-id=262
| 4262 DeVorkin || 1989 CO || David H. DeVorkin (born 1944), Chair of the Historical Astronomy Division of the American Astronomical Society (1997–1999) || 
|-id=263
| 4263 Abashiri ||  || Abashiri, Hokkaidō, Japan || 
|-id=264
| 4264 Karljosephine || 1989 TB || Karl Wilhelm Cwach and Josephine Anna-Maria Cwach, parents of the discoverer Karl F. J. Cwach || 
|-id=265
| 4265 Kani || 1989 TX || Kani, Gifu, Japan || 
|-id=266
| 4266 Waltari || 1940 YE || Mika Waltari (1908–1979), Finnish author || 
|-id=267
| 4267 Basner || 1971 QP || Veniamin Basner (1925–1996), Russian composer || 
|-id=268
| 4268 Grebenikov ||  || Evgenij Alexandrovich Grebenikov (Eugeniu Grebenicov), Romanian-born Russian mathematician and astronomer || 
|-id=269
| 4269 Bogado || 1974 FN || Manuel D. Bogado (born 1934) is a Paraguayan amateur astronomer, known for his contributions to amateur astronomy in his country and for his work involving astrophotography and variable stars. The name was suggested by W. A. Froger || 
|-id=270
| 4270 Juanvictoria ||  || Juan Victoria (1906–1986), a mining engineer by training, legal representative of the Yale-Columbia Southern Observatory (YCSO) station when it was under construction in the early 1960s, and supervised the construction of the dome and facilities for the U.S. Naval Observatory's station nearby. He also taught and researched in the engineering department of the Cuyo National University || 
|-id=271
| 4271 Novosibirsk ||  || Novosibirsk, Russia || 
|-id=272
| 4272 Entsuji ||  || Entsuji, temple of Okayama, Japan || 
|-id=273
| 4273 Dunhuang ||  || Dunhuang, China || 
|-id=274
| 4274 Karamanov ||  || Alemdar Karamanov, Ukrainian composer of symphonies, ballets, piano concerti, musicals and cinema films such as the 1965 movie Triumph Over Violence. || 
|-id=275
| 4275 Bogustafson ||  || Bo Åke Sture Gustafson (born 1953), Swedish-American astronomer at the University of Florida who studied small particles in the Solar System, their formation, evolution and fate || 
|-id=276
| 4276 Clifford || 1981 XA || Clifford Cunningham (born 1955), Canadian amateur astronomer and writer, known for his book Introduction to Asteroids || 
|-id=277
| 4277 Holubov || 1982 AF || Holubov, Czech Republic || 
|-id=278
| 4278 Harvey || 1982 SF || G. Roger Harvey, American educator and visual observer of minor planets who was instructor in astronomy at the University of North Carolina in Charlotte || 
|-id=279
| 4279 De Gasparis || 1982 WB || Annibale de Gasparis (1819–1892), Italian astronomer and early discoverer of minor planets who was the director of the Astronomical Observatory of Capodimonte in Naples || 
|-id=280
| 4280 Simonenko ||  || Alla Nikolaevna Simonenko (1935–1984), Russian or Ukrainian astronomer who published two books on the study of asteroids and studied study meteoroid fragmentation and the distribution of radiants || 
|-id=281
| 4281 Pounds ||  || Kenneth Pounds (born 1934), British astronomer || 
|-id=282
| 4282 Endate ||  || Kin Endate (born 1960), Japanese amateur astronomer and discoverer of minor planets || 
|-id=283
| 4283 Stöffler || 1988 BZ || Dieter Stöffler, German astronomer and director of the Institute for Planetology at the University of Münster || 
|-id=284
| 4284 Kaho ||  || Shigeru Kaho (1909–1981), Japanese astronomer and observer of variable stars at the Tokyo Observatory. He discovered comet  (Kaho-Kozik-Lis; a.k.a. comet 1936 III), the first Japanese cometary discovery in modern times. || 
|-id=285
| 4285 Hulkower || 1988 NH || Neal D. Hulkower, American mathematician and celestial mechanician || 
|-id=286
| 4286 Rubtsov ||  || Nikolay Rubtsov (1936–1971), Russian poet || 
|-id=287
| 4287 Třísov ||  || Třísov, Czech Republic || 
|-id=288
| 4288 Tokyotech ||  || Tokyo Institute of Technology, the largest national institution of higher learning in Japan dedicated to science and technology || 
|-id=289
| 4289 Biwako ||  || Biwako, largest lake in Japan || 
|-id=290
| 4290 Heisei ||  || The Heisei era, Japanese history || 
|-id=291
| 4291 Kodaihasu || 1989 VH || Ancient Lotus, that seed was excavated from Yayoi ruins and germinated in Japan || 
|-id=292
| 4292 Aoba || 1989 VO || Aoba Castle, Sendai, Miyagi, Japan || 
|-id=293
| 4293 Masumi || 1989 VT || Masumi Hurukawa (also Masumi Furukawa; 1917–?), Japanese worked for public outreach of astronomy in Kyushu, and a board member of the International Foundation for Cultural Harmony || 
|-id=294
| 4294 Horatius || 4016 P-L || Horace (Quintus Horatius Flaccus; 65–8 BC), Roman poet || 
|-id=295
| 4295 Wisse || 6032 P-L || Marijke Wisse-Schouten, staff member at Leiden Observatory and photometrist with the Palomar–Leiden trojan surveys during the 1970s || 
|-id=296
| 4296 van Woerkom ||  || Adriaan van Woerkom, Dutch astronomer who worked at Leiden and Yale observatories on the distribution of comets and on celestial mechanics. || 
|-id=297
| 4297 Eichhorn || 1938 HE || Heinrich Karl Eichhorn (born 1927), Austrian-American astronomer, teacher of astronomy and innovator in the field of stellar positions and motions || 
|-id=298
| 4298 Jorgenúnez || 1941 WA || Jorge Núnez (born 1953), physicist, astronomer and member of the Royal Academy of Sciences and Arts of Barcelona, researcher of robotic observatories and the treatment of astronomical CCD images || 
|-id=299
| 4299 WIYN || 1952 QX || The WIYN Consortium of observatories || 
|-id=300
| 4300 Marg Edmondson ||  || Margaret Russell Edmondson (1914–1999), daughter of American astronomer Henry Norris Russell and wife of American astronomer Frank K. Edmondson || 
|}

4301–4400 

|-
| 4301 Boyden || 1966 PM || Uriah A. Boyden (1804–1879), American mechanical engineer, whose bequest allowed the Harvard College Observatory to establish the Boyden Observatory || 
|-id=302
| 4302 Markeev || 1968 HP || Anatolij Pavlovich Markeev, professor at the Moscow Aviation Institute || 
|-id=303
| 4303 Savitskij ||  || Yevgeniy Savitskiy (1910–1990), Russian aviator, father of cosmonaut Svetlana Savitskaya || 
|-id=304
| 4304 Geichenko ||  || Semyon Stepanovich Geichenko, Russian writer and literary scholar || 
|-id=305
| 4305 Clapton || 1976 EC || Eric Clapton (born 1945), British musician || 
|-id=306
| 4306 Dunaevskij ||  || Isaak Dunayevsky (1900–1955), Soviet composer || 
|-id=307
| 4307 Cherepashchuk ||  || Anatolii Mikhailovich Cherepashchuk (born 1941), Russian astronomer and director of the Sternberg Astronomical Institute || 
|-id=308
| 4308 Magarach ||  || Research Institute of wine-making and viticulture at Magarach, Yalta || 
|-id=309
| 4309 Marvin || 1978 QC || Ursula Marvin (1921–2018), American planetary geologist || 
|-id=310
| 4310 Strömholm ||  || Stig Strömholm (born 1931), Swedish legal scholar and writer || 
|-id=311
| 4311 Zguridi ||  || Aleksandr Mikhajlovich Zguridi (1904–1998), Soviet producer || 
|-id=312
| 4312 Knacke ||  || Roger Fritz Knacke (born 1941), American astronomer || 
|-id=313
| 4313 Bouchet ||  || Patrice Bouchet (born 1953), French astronomer at the European Southern Observatory || 
|-id=314
| 4314 Dervan ||  || Peter Dervan, the Bren Professor of Chemistry at the California Institute of Technology || 
|-id=315
| 4315 Pronik ||  || Iraida and Vladimir Pronik (born 1932), astronomers at the Crimean Astrophysical Observatory || 
|-id=316
| 4316 Babinkova ||  || Artur Nikolaevich Babin (born 1936) and his wife Aleksandra Koval', solar astrophysicists at the Crimean Astrophysical Observatory || 
|-id=317
| 4317 Garibaldi ||  || Giuseppe Garibaldi (1807–1882), Italian nation-builder || 
|-id=318
| 4318 Baťa ||  || Tomáš Baťa (1876–1932), Czech businessman || 
|-id=319
| 4319 Jackierobinson ||  || Jackie Robinson (1919–1972), American baseball player || 
|-id=320
| 4320 Jarosewich ||  || Eugene Jarosewich (1926–2007), research chemist emeritus at the Smithsonian Institution || 
|-id=321
| 4321 Zero ||  || Zero Mostel (1915–1977), an American actor, singer and artist; also chosen because the asteroid's number sounds like a countdown || 
|-id=322
| 4322 Billjackson ||  || William M. Jackson (born 1936) of the Department of Chemistry, University of California || 
|-id=323
| 4323 Hortulus || 1981 QN || Hortulus, Latin word for a small, cozy garden || 
|-id=324
| 4324 Bickel ||  || Wolf Bickel (born 1942), a German amateur astronomer who started observing minor planets in 1995 at his private observatory, located close to Bergisch Gladbach || 
|-id=325
| 4325 Guest || 1982 HL || John Edward Guest (1938–2012), British volcanologist and planetary scientist (also see other Solar System features named after him) Src || 
|-id=326
| 4326 McNally ||  || Derek McNally (1934-2020), British astronomer || 
|-id=327
| 4327 Ries ||  || The Nördlinger Ries, a meteorite impact crater in southern Germany, that was formed about 14 million years ago || 
|-id=328
| 4328 Valina ||  || Valentina Arkadievna Andreichenko and daughter Alina Eduardovna, for their collaboration with the discoverer Henri Debehogne in the Tomsk-Observatory-Brussels-Program || 
|-id=329
| 4329 Miró ||  || Joan Miró (1893–1983), a famous Spanish Catalan painter, sculptor and ceramicist. || 
|-id=330
| 4330 Vivaldi ||  || Antonio Vivaldi (1678–1741), Italian composer || 
|-id=331
| 4331 Hubbard || 1983 HC || Ralph Hubbard (1885–1980), of Medora, North Dakota, involved in promoting and preserving Native American culture || 
|-id=332
| 4332 Milton || 1983 RC || Daniel J. Milton, American astrogeologist || 
|-id=333
| 4333 Sinton ||  || William M. Sinton, American astronomer || 
|-id=334
| 4334 Foo ||  || Lillian Foo (born 1972), Singaporean consultant at the World Bank || 
|-id=335
| 4335 Verona ||  || Verona, city in Italy || 
|-id=336
| 4336 Jasniewicz ||  || Gerard Jasniewicz, astronomer at Strasbourg Observatory || 
|-id=337
| 4337 Arecibo || 1985 GB || Arecibo Observatory, Puerto Rico || 
|-id=338
| 4338 Velez ||  || Reinaldo Velez, telescope operator at Arecibo Observatory || 
|-id=339
| 4339 Almamater || 1985 UK || Alma mater, in anticipation of the 650th anniversary of the Charles University in Prague, the oldest university in central Europe || 
|-id=340
| 4340 Dence || 1986 JZ || Michael R. Dence, Canadian geologist and executive director of the Royal Society of Canada || 
|-id=341
| 4341 Poseidon || 1987 KF || Poseidon, Greek god || 
|-id=342
| 4342 Freud ||  || Sigmund Freud (1856–1939), Austrian founder of psychoanalysis || 
|-id=343
| 4343 Tetsuya || 1988 AC || Tetsuya Fujii (born 1960), Japanese astronomer || 
|-id=344
| 4344 Buxtehude ||  || Dieterich Buxtehude (c. 1637–1707), Danish or German organist and composer || 
|-id=345
| 4345 Rachmaninoff ||  || Sergei Rachmaninoff (1873–1943), Russian composer, pianist and conductor || 
|-id=346
| 4346 Whitney ||  || Mary Watson Whitney (1847–1921), American astronomer || 
|-id=347
| 4347 Reger ||  || Max Reger (1873–1916), German composer || 
|-id=348
| 4348 Poulydamas || 1988 RU || Poulydamas, the closest counselor and strategist of the Trojan prince Hector. Born on the same night, the gods gave Hector the ability to perfectly master his arms, while Poulydamas was given the present of better judgment. It was Poulydamas who urged to lock the gates of Troy against Achilles, but Hector left the city and confronted Achilles nonetheless. || 
|-id=349
| 4349 Tibúrcio || 1989 LX || Julio Cesar dos Santos Tibúrcio, Brazilian amateur astronomer || 
|-id=350
| 4350 Shibecha ||  || Shibecha, Hokkaidō, Japan || 
|-id=351
| 4351 Nobuhisa ||  || Nobuhisa Kojima (born 1933), Japanese amateur astronomer || 
|-id=352
| 4352 Kyoto ||  || Kyoto, city in Japan || 
|-id=353
| 4353 Onizaki ||  || Onizaki, town in Tokoname, Aichi, Japan || 
|-id=354
| 4354 Euclides || 2142 P-L || Euclid (fl. 300 BC), Greek mathematician || 
|-id=355
| 4355 Memphis || 3524 P-L || Memphis, former capital of old Egyptian kingdom || 
|-id=356
| 4356 Marathon || 9522 P-L || Marathon, Greece || 
|-id=357
| 4357 Korinthos || 2069 T-2 || Korinthos, Greece || 
|-id=358
| 4358 Lynn || A909 TF || William Thynne Lynn (1835–1911), assistant at Greenwich Observatory || 
|-id=359
| 4359 Berlage || 1935 TG || Hendrik Petrus Berlage (1896–1968), Dutch meteorologist, son of architect Hendrik Petrus Berlage || 
|-id=360
| 4360 Xuyi ||  || Xuyi County, China || 
|-id=361
| 4361 Nezhdanova ||  || Antonina Nezhdanova (1873–1950), Russian opera singer || 
|-id=362
| 4362 Carlisle ||  || Albert John Carlisle (1917–1993), hunter of meteorites on the Nullarbor Plain of Western Australia || 
|-id=363
| 4363 Sergej ||  || Sergej Vasil'evich Ezhov (born 1953), surgeon in the district hospital at Bakhchisaraj, Crimea, since the 1970s || 
|-id=364
| 4364 Shkodrov ||  || Vladimir Shkodrov (1930–2010), Bulgarian astronomer || 
|-id=365
| 4365 Ivanova ||  || Violeta G. Ivanova, Bulgarian astronomer || 
|-id=366
| 4366 Venikagan ||  || Veniamin Kagan (1869–1953), Soviet and Russian mathematician || 
|-id=367
| 4367 Meech ||  || Karen Jean Meech (born 1959), American astronomer || 
|-id=368
| 4368 Pillmore ||  || Charles L. Pillmore, American geologist with the U.S. Geological Survey || 
|-id=369
| 4369 Seifert || 1982 OR || Jaroslav Seifert (1901–1986), Czech poet || 
|-id=370
| 4370 Dickens || 1982 SL || Charles Dickens (1812–1870), English writer || 
|-id=371
| 4371 Fyodorov ||  || Svyatoslav Fyodorov (1927–2000), Russian ophthalmologist || 
|-id=372
| 4372 Quincy || 1984 TB || John Quincy Adams (1767–1848), sixth president of the United States || 
|-id=373
| 4373 Crespo || 1985 PB || Antonio Crespo, electrical engineer at Arecibo Observatory || 
|-id=374
| 4374 Tadamori || 1987 BJ || Taira no Tadamori, early samurai || 
|-id=375
| 4375 Kiyomori || 1987 DQ || Taira no Kiyomori, early samurai and Daijō Daijin || 
|-id=376
| 4376 Shigemori || 1987 FA || Taira no Shigemori, early samurai || 
|-id=377
| 4377 Koremori || 1987 GD || Taira no Koremori, early samurai || 
|-id=378
| 4378 Voigt || 1988 JF || Hans-Heinrich Voigt (1921–2017), German astronomer || 
|-id=379
| 4379 Snelling ||  || Reginald and Heather Snelling, friends of the discoverers Eugene and Carolyn Shoemaker || 
|-id=380
| 4380 Geyer ||  || Edward H. Geyer, German astronomer at the Hoher List Observatory || 
|-id=381
| 4381 Uenohara ||  || Uenohara, town in Japan || 
|-id=382
| 4382 Stravinsky ||  || Igor Stravinsky (1882–1971), Russian-American composer || 
|-id=383
| 4383 Suruga || 1989 XP || Suruga Province (ancient name of eastern part of Shizuoka Prefecture), Japan || 
|-id=384
| 4384 Henrybuhl || 1990 AA || Henry Buhl Jr. (1848–1927), a philanthropist who established the Buhl Foundation || 
|-id=385
| 4385 Elsässer || 2534 P-L || Hans F. Elsässer (born 1929), German astronomer, former director of the Max Planck Institute for Astronomy || 
|-id=386
| 4386 Lüst || 6829 P-L || Reimar Lüst (born 1923), German astrophysicist || 
|-id=387
| 4387 Tanaka || 4829 T-2 || Yasuo Tanaka (1931–2018), Japanese astrophysicist || 
|-id=388
| 4388 Jürgenstock || 1964 VE || Jürgen Stock (born 1923), German-Venezuelan astronomer, developer observatories, and the director of the CTIO and the Llano del Hato observatories in South America || 
|-id=389
| 4389 Durbin ||  || Deanna Durbin (1921–2013), Canadian-American cinema actress || 
|-id=390
| 4390 Madreteresa ||  || Mother Teresa (1910–1997), an Albanian-Indian nun and missionary. She is known as Saint Teresa of Calcutta in the Roman Catholic Church. || 
|-id=391
| 4391 Balodis ||  || Jānis Balodis, chief of the cosmic geodesy department at the Astronomical Observatory of the Latvian University || 
|-id=392
| 4392 Agita ||  || Agita Tarasova, a scientific worker at the Astronomical Observatory of the Latvian University || 
|-id=393
| 4393 Dawe ||  || John A. Dawe, British astronomer at the UK Schmidt Telescope || 
|-id=394
| 4394 Fritzheide ||  || Fritz Heide (1891–1973), German meteorite researcher || 
|-id=395
| 4395 Danbritt ||  || Daniel Britt (born 1950), research professor at the University of Tennessee, who studies the relationships between minor planets and meteorites using reflectance spectroscopy || 
|-id=396
| 4396 Gressmann || 1981 JH || Michael Gressmann, German astro-optician and amateur astronomer || 
|-id=397
| 4397 Jalopez ||  || José Augusto Lopez (born 1922), astronomer and long-time director of the Felix Aguilar Observatory in Argentina || 
|-id=398
| 4398 Chiara ||  || Chiara Maria Faletti (born 1955), wife of the discoverer Walter Ferreri || 
|-id=399
| 4399 Ashizuri || 1984 UA || Cape Ashizuri, Kochi, Japan || 
|-id=400
| 4400 Bagryana ||  || Elisaveta Bagriana (1893–1991), Bulgarian poet || 
|}

4401–4500 

|-
| 4401 Aditi || 1985 TB || Aditi, Hindu goddess of the sky and air || 
|-id=402
| 4402 Tsunemori || 1987 DP || Taira no Tsunemori (1124–1185), early samurai || 
|-id=403
| 4403 Kuniharu || 1987 EA || Kuniharu Observatory, founded in 1958 in Okazaki, Aichi prefecture, Japan || 
|-id=404
| 4404 Enirac || 1987 GG || Carine Maury, wife of the French astronomer Alain Maury, who discovered this minor planet || 
|-id=405
| 4405 Otava ||  || Otava River, Czech Republic || 
|-id=406
| 4406 Mahler ||  || Gustav Mahler (1860–1911), Austrian composer || 
|-id=407
| 4407 Taihaku ||  || Taihaku-ku, Sendai, the southernmost ward of the city Sendai, Japan || 
|-id=408
| 4408 Zlatá Koruna ||  || Zlatá Koruna, a gothic monastery and a village in South Bohemia, Czech Republic || 
|-id=409
| 4409 Kissling || 1989 MD || Warwick M. Kissling (born 1957), New Zealand mathematician || 
|-id=410
| 4410 Kamuimintara || 1989 YA || Daisetsuzan's another name in Ainu mythology - meaning Playground of Kamuys || 
|-id=411
| 4411 Kochibunkyo || 1990 AF || The Kochi Prefecture Cultural and Educational Association, an association of volunteers active in education including the popularization of astronomy. The association inaugurated in the city of Kochi in April 1948. || 
|-id=412
| 4412 Chephren || 2535 P-L || Khafra (Chephren), pharaoh of the Fourth dynasty of Egypt who built the eponymous pyramid at Giza and the Sphinx || 
|-id=413
| 4413 Mycerinos || 4020 P-L || Menkaura (Mycerinos), pharaoh of the Fourth dynasty of Egypt || 
|-id=414
| 4414 Sesostris || 4153 P-L || Senusret I, Senusret II, and Senusret III (Sesostris I,II and III), three pharaohs of the Twelfth dynasty of Egypt || 
|-id=415
| 4415 Echnaton || 4237 P-L || Akhenaten (Echnaton), pharaoh of the Eighteenth dynasty of Egypt || 
|-id=416
| 4416 Ramses || 4530 P-L || Ramesses II, pharaoh of the Nineteenth dynasty of Egypt || 
|-id=417
| 4417 Lecar || 1931 GC || Myron Lecar (born 1930), American astrophysicist || 
|-id=418
| 4418 Fredfranklin ||  || Fred Aldrich Franklin (born 1932), American astronomer || 
|-id=419
| 4419 Allancook || 1932 HD || Allan F. Cook II (1922–1998), American astrophysicist || 
|-id=420
| 4420 Alandreev || 1936 PB || Aleksandr Fedorovich Andreev (born 1939), vice-president of the Russian Academy of Sciences and director of the P. Kapitsa Institute of Physical Problems in Moscow. || 
|-id=421
| 4421 Kayor || 1942 AC || Kay and Roy Williams, parents of Gareth V. Williams, an astronomer at the Minor Planet Center || 
|-id=422
| 4422 Jarre || 1942 UA || Jean-Michel Jarre (born 1948), a French composer, and his father Maurice Jarre (1924–2009) || 
|-id=423
| 4423 Golden || 1949 GH || William T. Golden (1909–2007), author-editor of books on science policy. || 
|-id=424
| 4424 Arkhipova || 1967 DB || Irina Konstantinovna Arkhipova (born 1925), Russian soloist at the Bolshoi Theatre || 
|-id=425
| 4425 Bilk || 1967 UQ || German city district Düsseldorf-Bilk, where the Düsseldorf-Bilk Observatory existed from 1843 to 1943 || 
|-id=426
| 4426 Roerich ||  || Nicholas Roerich (1874–1947), Russian painter, as well as for Elena Ivanovna Roerich (1879–1955), Russian writer, Yurij Nikolaevich Roerich (1902–1960), Russian scientist, and Svetoslav Roerich (1904–1993), Russian painter || 
|-id=427
| 4427 Burnashev ||  || Vladislav Ivanovich Burnashev (born 1943) also Bella Alekseevna Burnasheva (born 1944) (Crimean Astrophysical Observatory) || 
|-id=428
| 4428 Khotinok || 1977 SN || Roman L'vovich Khotinok (1928–2016), Russian meteorite researcher || 
|-id=429
| 4429 Chinmoy ||  || Sri Chinmoy (1931–2007), Indian poet, artist and philosopher || 
|-id=430
| 4430 Govorukhin ||  || Stanislav Govorukhin (1936–2018), Russian cinematic producer and playwright || 
|-id=431
| 4431 Holeungholee ||  || S. H. Ho, K.-K. Leung, T. Ho and Q.-W. Lee jointly established the Holeungholee Foundation in 1994 to reward high-level Chinese achievements in science and technology and to promote the further development of those achievements || 
|-id=432
| 4432 McGraw-Hill ||  || the McGraw-Hill Telescope at the MDM Observatory || 
|-id=433
| 4433 Goldstone || 1981 QP || Goldstone Deep Space Communications Complex, California || 
|-id=434
| 4434 Nikulin ||  || Yuri Nikulin (1921–1997), a Russian circus artist, clown and film star || 
|-id=435
| 4435 Holt ||  || Henry E. Holt (born 1929), a discoverer of minor planets and planetary geologist with the U.S. Geological Survey || 
|-id=436
| 4436 Ortizmoreno || 1983 EX || José Luis Ortiz Moreno (born 1967), a planetary scientist at the IAA (CSIC) at Granada, Spain || 
|-id=437
| 4437 Yaroshenko ||  || Nikolai Yaroshenko (1846–1898), Russian/Ukrainian painter || 
|-id=438
| 4438 Sykes || 1983 WR || Mark V. Sykes, American planetary scientist at the Steward Observatory, Arizona || 
|-id=439
| 4439 Muroto || 1984 VA || Muroto, Kōchi, city in Japan || 
|-id=440
| 4440 Tchantchès || 1984 YV || Tchantchès (Walloon dialect for François), the typical Walloon hero of the region of the discoverer. Tchantchès is obstinate but has a great heart || 
|-id=441
| 4441 Toshie || 1985 BB || Toshie Seki, mother of Japanese astronomer Tsutomu Seki, who discovered this minor planet || 
|-id=442
| 4442 Garcia ||  || Jerry Garcia (1942–1995), lead guitarist of the Grateful Dead || 
|-id=443
| 4443 Paulet ||  || Pedro Paulet (1874–1945), Peruvian scientist and diplomat || 
|-id=444
| 4444 Escher || 1985 SA || M. C. Escher (1898–1972), Dutch graphic artist || 
|-id=445
| 4445 Jimstratton || 1985 TC || James Michael Stratton (born 1976), an American space engineer, helped further the exploration of the planets through his roles as both the propulsion and deputy mission systems engineer on NASA's New Horizons Pluto-Kuiper Belt mission. || 
|-id=446
| 4446 Carolyn || 1985 TT || Carolyn Shoemaker (1929–2021), comet and asteroid discoverer || 
|-id=447
| 4447 Kirov ||  || After Kirov, the city in Russia, or after the Kirov Opera and Ballet Theatre || 
|-id=448
| 4448 Phildavis || 1986 EO || Philip A. Davis, astronomer and planetary geologist with the U.S. Geological Survey || 
|-id=449
| 4449 Sobinov ||  || Leonid Sobinov (1872–1934), Russian opera singer || 
|-id=450
| 4450 Pan || 1987 SY || Pan god of Arcady || 
|-id=451
| 4451 Grieve || 1988 JJ || Richard Andrew Francis Grieve, Canadian geologist with the Geological Survey of Canada || 
|-id=452
| 4452 Ullacharles || 1988 RN || Ulla Augustesen (1914–1990) and Charles Augustesen (1909–1987), the parents of Brorfelde observer Karl Augustesen || 
|-id=453
| 4453 Bornholm || 1988 VC || The beautiful and famous Danish rocky island of Bornholm is situated in the southern part of the Baltic Sea || 
|-id=454
| 4454 Kumiko || 1988 VW || Kumiko Kaneda (born 1951), wife of Japanese astronomer Hiroshi Kaneda, who co-discovered this minor planet || 
|-id=455
| 4455 Ruriko || 1988 XA || Ruriko Ueda (born 1957), wife of Japanese astronomer Seiji Ueda, who co-discovered this minor planet || 
|-id=456
| 4456 Mawson || 1989 OG || Sir Douglas Mawson (1882–1958), Antarctic explorer || 
|-id=457
| 4457 van Gogh || 1989 RU || Vincent van Gogh (1853–1890), Dutch painter || 
|-id=458
| 4458 Oizumi || 1990 BY || Ōizumi, Yamanashi, Japan || 
|-id=459
| 4459 Nusamaibashi ||  || Nusamai Bridge, located in Kushiro, on the Island of Hokkaidō in northern Japan || 
|-id=460
| 4460 Bihoro || 1990 DS || Bihoro, town in Japan || 
|-id=461
| 4461 Sayama || 1990 EL || Sayama, Saitama, Japan || 
|-id=462
| 4462 Vaughan ||  || Curtis T. Vaughan Jr., a businessman, and community leader of San Antonio, Texas || 
|-id=463
| 4463 Marschwarzschild ||  || Martin Schwarzschild (1912–1997), German-American astrophysicist || 
|-id=464
| 4464 Vulcano || 1966 TE || Aeolian Islands, site of the "original" volcano || 
|-id=465
| 4465 Rodita ||  || Tat'yana Mikhajlovna Rodina (1914–1989), a Soviet art critic, was the author of Russian Theatre Art at the Beginning of the 19th Century and Blok and Russian Theatre of the Beginning of the 20th Century, as well as of numerous papers in the Great Soviet Encyclopedia and the Theatre Encyclopedia. || 
|-id=466
| 4466 Abai ||  || Abai Qunanbaiuli (Abai Kunanbaev) (1845–1904), Kazakh poet and philosopher || 
|-id=467
| 4467 Kaidanovskij ||  || Naum L'vovich Kaidanovskii (1907–), Russian astronomer || 
|-id=468
| 4468 Pogrebetskij ||  || Mikhail Pogrebetskiy (1892–1956), Ukrainian mountaineer || 
|-id=469
| 4469 Utting ||  || Muriel Utting (1914–), Australian historian of the Perth Observatory || 
|-id=470
| 4470 Sergeev-Censkij ||  || Sergey Sergeev-Tsensky (1875–1958), Soviet writer || 
|-id=471
| 4471 Graculus || 1978 VB || Pyrrhocorax graculus is the Alpine species of choughs. In great flocks they are sometimes a bit of a nuisance, but to watch their masterly elegant flight, especially in turbulent air, is a great delight || 
|-id=472
| 4472 Navashin ||  || Mikhail Sergeevich Navashin (1896–1973), Russian author of the Teleskop astronoma-lyubitelya (The Amateur Astronomer's Telescope) || 
|-id=473
| 4473 Sears ||  || Derek W. G. Sears (born 1948), British meteoriticist || 
|-id=474
| 4474 Proust ||  || Dominique Proust, French astrophysicist || 
|-id=475
| 4475 Voitkevich ||  || Georgii Vitol'dovich Voitkevich (1920–1997), Russian geochemist || 
|-id=476
| 4476 Bernstein || 1983 DE || Leonard Bernstein (1918–1990), American composer, conductor and pianist || 
|-id=477
| 4477 Kelley || 1983 SB || Michael Shawn Kelley (born 1958), a program officer at the Planetary Science Division, NASA Headquarters, Washington, D.C. || 
|-id=478
| 4478 Blanco ||  || Carlo Blanco, professor of astronomy at Catania University || 
|-id=479
| 4479 Charlieparker ||  || Charlie "Bird" Parker (1920–1955), American saxophonist, principal inventor of bebop || 
|-id=480
| 4480 Nikitibotania ||  || Nikitian State Botanical Gardens, founded in 1812, on the Crimean peninsula || 
|-id=481
| 4481 Herbelin || 1985 RR || Claude Herbelin (born 1931), Swiss electrotechnical engineer of Neuchâtel and friend of the family of Edward L. G. Bowell (discoverer) || 
|-id=482
| 4482 Frèrebasile || 1986 RB || Nicolas Dupont, a French professor of mathematics, amateur astronomer and member of the De La Salle Brothers, || 
|-id=483
| 4483 Petöfi ||  || Sándor Petőfi (1823–1849), Hungarian poet || 
|-id=484
| 4484 Sif || 1987 DD || Sif, Norse goddess || 
|-id=485
| 4485 Radonezhskij ||  || Sergij Radonezhskij (c. 1321–1391), Russian church official || 
|-id=486
| 4486 Mithra || 1987 SB || Mithra, Indo-Iranian god || 
|-id=487
| 4487 Pocahontas || 1987 UA || Pocahontas, Native American woman || 
|-id=488
| 4488 Tokitada || 1987 UK || Taira no Tokitada (1130–1189), early samurai || 
|-id=489
| 4489 Dracius || 1988 AK || Dracius was one of the commanders of the Epeans who fought to protect the Argive ships from Hektor's attack. || 
|-id=490
| 4490 Bambery || 1988 ND || Raymond Bambery, American chemist and image-processing scientist at JPL || 
|-id=491
| 4491 Otaru || 1988 RP || Otaru, Hokkaidō, Japan || 
|-id=492
| 4492 Debussy || 1988 SH || Claude Debussy (1862–1918), French composer || 
|-id=493
| 4493 Naitomitsu ||  || Mitsu Naito (born 1925), mother of the first female Japanese astronaut, Chiaki Mukai || 
|-id=494
| 4494 Marimo ||  || Marimo, a rare growth form of green algae that inhabit Lake Akan in Hokkaido, Japan. || 
|-id=495
| 4495 Dassanowsky || 1988 VS || Elfi Dassanowsky (1924–2007), an Austrian-born film pioneer || 
|-id=496
| 4496 Kamimachi ||  || Kamimachi, town in Kōchi, Japan. Birthplace of discover || 
|-id=497
| 4497 Taguchi ||  || Takeo Taguchi (born 1950), Japanese optical engineer || 
|-id=498
| 4498 Shinkoyama ||  || Shin Koyama (born 1927), Japanese astronomer || 
|-id=499
| 4499 Davidallen ||  || David Anthony Allen, British astronomer || 
|-id=500
| 4500 Pascal || 1989 CL || Blaise Pascal (1623–1662), French mathematician, physicist, and religious philosopher || 
|}

4501–4600 

|-
| 4501 Eurypylos ||  || Eurypylos, mythical king of Thessaly || 
|-id=502
| 4502 Elizabethann || 1989 KG || Elizabeth Ann Holt, daughter of the discoverer Henry E. Holt || 
|-id=503
| 4503 Cleobulus || 1989 WM || Ancient Greek poet Cleobulus, one of the Seven Sages of Greece || 
|-id=504
| 4504 Jenkinson || 1989 YO || Nora Jenkinson, Scottish amateur astronomer and astronomy educator || 
|-id=505
| 4505 Okamura ||  || Keiichiro Okamura, Japanese headmaster || 
|-id=506
| 4506 Hendrie || 1990 FJ || Michael J. Hendrie, British amateur astronomer and author, astronomy correspondent for The Times || 
|-id=507
| 4507 Petercollins || 1990 FV || Peter L. Collins, American amateur astronomer || 
|-id=508
| 4508 Takatsuki ||  || Yukihiro Takatsuki, contributing editor of Japanese astronomical magazine || 
|-id=509
| 4509 Gorbatskij || A917 SG || Vitaly Gerasimovich Gorbatskij (born 1920), professor at St. Petersburg University || 
|-id=510
| 4510 Shawna || 1930 XK || Shawna Willoughby, granddaughter of the discoverer Clyde Tombaugh || 
|-id=511
| 4511 Rembrandt ||  || Rembrandt Harmenszoon van Rijn, Dutch painter and engraver || 
|-id=512
| 4512 Sinuhe || 1939 BM || Sinuhe, hero of The Egyptian by Mika Waltari || 
|-id=513
| 4513 Louvre ||  || The Louvre, museum || 
|-id=514
| 4514 Vilen || 1972 HX || Vilen Valentinovich Nesterov, Russian astronomer || 
|-id=515
| 4515 Khrennikov ||  || Tikhon Nikolayevich Khrennikov, Russian composer || 
|-id=516
| 4516 Pugovkin ||  || Mikhail Pugovkin, Russian comic actor || 
|-id=517
| 4517 Ralpharvey || 1975 SV || Ralph Harvey (born 1960), An assistant professor at Case Western University || 
|-id=518
| 4518 Raikin ||  || Arkady Raikin, Russian actor || 
|-id=519
| 4519 Voronezh ||  || Voronezh, Russia || 
|-id=520
| 4520 Dovzhenko ||  || Alexander Dovzhenko, Ukrainian filmmaker || 
|-id=521
| 4521 Akimov ||  || Nikolai Pavlovich Akimov, Ukrainian scenic designer and stage designer || 
|-id=522
| 4522 Britastra || 1980 BM || British Astronomical Association || 
|-id=523
| 4523 MIT ||  || Massachusetts Institute of Technology || 
|-id=524
| 4524 Barklajdetolli ||  || Prince Michael Andreas Barclay de Tolly, Russian field marshal of Scottish descent || 
|-id=525
| 4525 Johnbauer ||  || John Bauer, American teacher of astronomy and physics || 
|-id=526
| 4526 Konko ||  || Konkō, Okayama, Japan || 
|-id=527
| 4527 Schoenberg || 1982 OK || Arnold Schoenberg, Austrian-American composer || 
|-id=528
| 4528 Berg || 1983 PP || Alban Berg, Austrian composer || 
|-id=529
| 4529 Webern || 1984 ED || Anton Webern, Austrian composer || 
|-id=530
| 4530 Smoluchowski || 1984 EP || Roman Smoluchowski, Polish-born physicist and astrophysicist || 
|-id=531
| 4531 Asaro || 1985 FC || Frank Asaro, American nuclear chemist and colleague of Walter and Louis Alvarez || 
|-id=532
| 4532 Copland ||  || Aaron Copland, American composer || 
|-id=533
| 4533 Orth || 1986 EL || Charles J. Orth, American geochemist at the Los Alamos National Laboratory, New Mexico || 
|-id=534
| 4534 Rimskij-Korsakov ||  || Nikolai Rimsky-Korsakov (1844–1908), Russian composer || 
|-id=535
| 4535 Adamcarolla ||  || Adam Carolla, American comedic radio and television personality, former co-host of the syndicated radio program Loveline || 
|-id=536
| 4536 Drewpinsky ||  || David Drew Pinsky (Dr. Drew), American doctor who co-hosts the syndicated radio program Loveline || 
|-id=537
| 4537 Valgrirasp ||  || Valentin Rasputin, Soviet writer || 
|-id=538
| 4538 Vishyanand || 1988 TP || Viswanathan (Vishy) Anand (born 1969), India's first chess grandmaster || 
|-id=539
| 4539 Miyagino ||  || Miyagino-ku, Sendai, Miyagi, Japan || 
|-id=540
| 4540 Oriani ||  || Barnaba Oriani (Barnabus Oriani), Italian astronomer || 
|-id=541
| 4541 Mizuno || 1989 AF || Yoshikane Mizuno, Japanese amateur astronomer || 
|-id=542
| 4542 Mossotti || 1989 BO || Ottaviano-Fabrizio Mossotti, Italian physicist and astronomer || 
|-id=543
| 4543 Phoinix ||  || Phoinix, mythical Greek warrior || 
|-id=544
| 4544 Xanthus || 1989 FB || Xanthus (Greek word for "Fair"), was one of Achilles' semi-divine horses (in the Iliad). Also Xanthus (or Xanthos) is the name given to the river God, (known as Scamander or Skamandros to mortals). The official naming citation also mentions that it is an alternative name for the Olympian god Apollo. || 
|-id=545
| 4545 Primolevi ||  || Primo Levi (1919–1987), an Italian chemist and writer || 
|-id=546
| 4546 Franck ||  || César Franck, Belgian composer || 
|-id=547
| 4547 Massachusetts || 1990 KP || Massachusetts, United States || 
|-id=548
| 4548 Wielen || 2538 P-L || Roland Wielen (born 1938), German astronomer || 
|-id=549
| 4549 Burkhardt || 1276 T-2 || Gernot Burkhardt (born 1951), German astronomer, co-editor of Astronomy and Astrophysics Abstracts || 
|-id=550
| 4550 Royclarke ||  || Roy Clarke Jr. (born 1925) served as curator of the U.S. National Meteorite Collection at the Smithsonian Institution for nearly 30 years. Clarke's research interests have focused on the structures of iron meteorites and have included the classification and study of Antarctic iron meteorites || 
|-id=551
| 4551 Cochran || 1979 MC || Anita Light Cochran, American astronomer and William David Cochran, American astronomer || 
|-id=552
| 4552 Nabelek || 1980 JC || Jan Nabelek, Moravian teacher || 
|-id=553
| 4553 Doncampbell || 1982 RH || Donald B. Campbell, Australian-born astronomer and planetary scientist at Cornell University || 
|-id=554
| 4554 Fanynka || 1986 UT || "Fanynka" Burian, friend of the discoverer || 
|-id=555
| 4555 Josefapérez || 1987 QL || María Josefa Pérez (1970–2014), an astronomer at the Instituto de Astronomía y Física del Espacio, Buenos Aires, and at the La Plata Astronomical Observatory || 
|-id=556
| 4556 Gumilyov ||  || Nikolay Gumilyov, Russian poet || 
|-id=557
| 4557 Mika || 1987 XD || Mika Watanabe, wife of one of discovers || 
|-id=558
| 4558 Janesick || 1988 NF || James R. Janesick, American optical engineer || 
|-id=559
| 4559 Strauss ||  || Johann Strauss II, Austrian composer || 
|-id=560
| 4560 Klyuchevskij ||  || Vasily Klyuchevsky, Russian historian || 
|-id=561
| 4561 Lemeshev ||  || Sergey Lemeshev, Russian opera singer || 
|-id=562
| 4562 Poleungkuk ||  || This name celebrates the 125th anniversary of the founding of Po Leung Kuk, a famous charity in Hong Kong. With a firm commitment to care and protection for the young and the innocent, Po Leung Kuk serves the local community || 
|-id=563
| 4563 Kahnia || 1980 OG || Franz D. Kahn, professor of astronomy and head of the department of astronomy at the University of Manchester || 
|-id=564
| 4564 Clayton ||  || Robert Clayton (born 1930), a professor at the University of Chicago || 
|-id=565
| 4565 Grossman ||  || Lawrence Grossman (born 1946), Canadian-American geophysicist || 
|-id=566
| 4566 Chaokuangpiu ||  || Kuang-Piu Chao, consulting professor at Tsinghua University and Zhejiang University. For many years, he made remarkable contributions to the development of Chinese educational and cultural programs || 
|-id=567
| 4567 Bečvář ||  || Antonín Bečvář, Slovak astronomer || 
|-id=568
| 4568 Menkaure ||  || Pharaoh Menkaure (c. 2530 B.C.), the son of Chephren || 
|-id=569
| 4569 Baerbel ||  || Baerbel K. Lucchitta, planetary geologist with the U.S. Geological Survey || 
|-id=570
| 4570 Runcorn || 1985 PR || Keith Runcorn (Stanley Keith Runcorn), British geophysicist || 
|-id=571
| 4571 Grumiaux ||  || Arthur Grumiaux, Belgian violinist || 
|-id=572
| 4572 Brage || 1986 RF || Brage, Norse god of poetry and music || 
|-id=573
| 4573 Piešťany ||  || Slovak spa town of Piešťany || 
|-id=574
| 4574 Yoshinaka || 1986 YB || Minamoto no Yoshinaka, early samurai || 
|-id=575
| 4575 Broman ||  || Brian Roman, American astronomer || 
|-id=576
| 4576 Yanotoyohiko || 1988 CC || Toyohiko Yano (born 1952) is a professor at the Research Laboratory for Nuclear Reactors, Tokyo Institute of Technology. His major work is materials science, particularly in the field of ceramics, and he is also a skillful electron microscopist. In their youth, he and the discoverer climbed mountains together || 
|-id=577
| 4577 Chikako || 1988 WG || Chikako Mitsuhashi (or Mihashi), Japanese astronomical educator || 
|-id=578
| 4578 Kurashiki ||  || Kurashiki, Okayama, Japan || 
|-id=579
| 4579 Puccini ||  || Giacomo Antonio Domenico Michele Secondo Maria Puccini, Italian operatic composer || 
|-id=580
| 4580 Child || 1989 EF || Jack B. Child, astronomer || 
|-id=581
| 4581 Asclepius || 1989 FC || Asclepius, god of medicine || 
|-id=582
| 4582 Hank || 1989 FW || Henry Reid Holt, son of discoverer of minor planets Henry E. Holt || 
|-id=583
| 4583 Lugo ||  || Raymond Lugo (born 1957), American deputy launch services manager on NASA's New Horizons Pluto-Kuiper Belt mission || 
|-id=584
| 4584 Akan || 1990 FA || Akan National Park, Hokkaidō, Japan || 
|-id=585
| 4585 Ainonai || 1990 KQ || Ainonai, a small Japanese town on Hokkaidō, west of Kitami || 
|-id=586
| 4586 Gunvor || 6047 P-L || Gunvor Ulla Marie Ollongren-Lundgren, wife of Dutch astronomer Alexander Ollongren || 
|-id=587
| 4587 Rees || 3239 T-2 || Martin Rees (born 1942), English astrophysicist and longtime Astronomer Royal || 
|-id=588
| 4588 Wislicenus || 1931 EE || Walter F. Wislicenus (1859–1905), a German astronomer || 
|-id=589
| 4589 McDowell || 1933 OB || Jonathan McDowell (born 1960), American astrophysicist || 
|-id=590
| 4590 Dimashchegolev ||  || Dmytrij Evgen'evich Shchegolev (1928–1988), a Russian astronomer at the Pulkovo Observatory near 	Saint Petersburg || 
|-id=591
| 4591 Bryantsev || 1975 VZ || Alexander Bryantsev (1883–1961), Russian theatre director || 
|-id=592
| 4592 Alkissia ||  || Aleksej Alekseevich Kiselev (born 1927), Russian astronomer || 
|-id=593
| 4593 Reipurth ||  || Bo Reipurth, Danish astronomer || 
|-id=594
| 4594 Dashkova ||  || Ekaterina Romanovna Dashkova, Russian princess || 
|-id=595
| 4595 Prinz ||  || Martin Prinz (born 1931), American curator of meteorites at the American Museum of Natural History || 
|-id=597
| 4597 Consolmagno ||  || Guy Consolmagno, American astronomer || 
|-id=598
| 4598 Coradini ||  || Marcello Coradini, Italian planetary scientist or Angioletta Coradini, Italian planetary scientist || 
|-id=599
| 4599 Rowan ||  || Michael Rowan-Robinson, British astronomer || 
|-id=600
| 4600 Meadows ||  || Jack Meadows, British astronomer || 
|}

4601–4700 

|-
| 4601 Ludkewycz || 1986 LB || The maiden name of the Ukrainian-born mother of the discoverer, American NASA astronomer, writer, cartoonist, planetary scientist, artist and Hollywood special effects animator Marian Rudnyk || 
|-id=602
| 4602 Heudier ||  || Jean Louis Heudier, French astronomer || 
|-id=603
| 4603 Bertaud ||  || Charles Bertaud, French astronomer || 
|-id=604
| 4604 Stekarstrom || 1987 SK || Stephen E. and Karen M. Strom, American astronomers and photographers || 
|-id=605
| 4605 Nikitin ||  || Afanasy Nikitin, Russian explorer and travel writer || 
|-id=606
| 4606 Saheki ||  || Tsuneo Saeki, Japanese astronomer and president of the Toa Astronomical Society || 
|-id=607
| 4607 Seilandfarm || 1987 WR || Seiland Farm, Hokkaidō, Japan || 
|-id=608
| 4608 Wodehouse ||  || Sir Pelham Grenville Wodehouse, British comic writer || 
|-id=609
| 4609 Pizarro ||  || Guido and Oscar Pizarro, Chilean astronomers || 
|-id=610
| 4610 Kájov || 1989 FO || Village of Kájov, Czech Republic || 
|-id=611
| 4611 Vulkaneifel ||  || Volcanic Eifel, a landscape in Germany, shaped by its volcanic geological history || 
|-id=612
| 4612 Greenstein || 1989 JG || Jesse L. Greenstein, an expert in stellar spectroscopy || 
|-id=613
| 4613 Mamoru || 1990 OM || Mamoru Mohri, Japanese astronaut || 
|-id=614
| 4614 Masamura || 1990 QN || Kazutada Masamura, Japanese amateur astronomer || 
|-id=615
| 4615 Zinner || A923 RH || Ernst Zinner, German astronomer and historian of astronomy || 
|-id=616
| 4616 Batalov || 1975 BF || Aleksei Vladimirovich Batalov, Russian actor || 
|-id=617
| 4617 Zadunaisky || 1976 DK || Pedro E. Zadunaisky (1918–), Argentinian astronomer and mathematician || 
|-id=618
| 4618 Shakhovskoj ||  || Nikolaj Mikhailovich Shakhovskoj (born 1930), astrophysicist at the Crimean Astrophysical Observatory || 
|-id=619
| 4619 Polyakhova ||  || Elena Nikolaevna Palyakhova, assistant professor of astronomy at Saint Petersburg State University, Russia || 
|-id=620
| 4620 Bickley || 1978 OK || Named for the present site (since 1966) of the Perth Observatory. In 1915 the locality, in the Darling Range 23 km east-southeast of the center of the city, was officially named for Samuel Wallace Alexander Walsh Bickley (1810–1876), a pioneer in the area who was also a successful merchant and a nominated member of the Legislative Council of the colony (as it was at that time) of Western Australia || 
|-id=621
| 4621 Tambov ||  || Tambov, Russia || 
|-id=622
| 4622 Solovjova ||  || Sergey Solovyov (1820–1879), Russian historian, and his son Vladimir Solovyov, philosopher || 
|-id=623
| 4623 Obraztsova ||  || Elena Obraztsova, Russian singer || 
|-id=624
| 4624 Stefani ||  || J. Stefani Salazar, granddaughter of the first discoverer || 
|-id=625
| 4625 Shchedrin ||  || Rodion Konstantinovich Shchedrin, Russian composer || 
|-id=626
| 4626 Plisetskaya ||  || Maya Plisetskaya, Russian ballerina, wife of Rodion Konstantinovich Shchedrin || 
|-id=627
| 4627 Pinomogavero ||  || Giuseppe Mogavero (born 1954), an Italian medical doctor in Isnello, Palermo. || 
|-id=628
| 4628 Laplace ||  || Pierre-Simon Marquis de Laplace, French mathematician and astronomer || 
|-id=629
| 4629 Walford ||  || Roy Walford (1924–2004), professor of pathology at the UCLA School of Medicine in California || 
|-id=630
| 4630 Chaonis || 1987 WA || Italian comune of Chions in northern Italy, location of the Chaonis Observatory || 
|-id=631
| 4631 Yabu ||  || Yasuo Yabu (born 1932), Japanese amateur astronomer || 
|-id=632
| 4632 Udagawa || 1987 YB || Tetsuo Udagawa (born 1947) developer of a laser holographic system for precise measurements || 
|-id=633
| 4633 Marinbica ||  || Marin Dacian Bica (1970–2013), a Romanian professor of physics and astronomy || 
|-id=634
| 4634 Shibuya || 1988 BA || Shibuya, Tokyo, Japan || 
|-id=635
| 4635 Rimbaud ||  || Arthur Rimbaud, French poet || 
|-id=636
| 4636 Chile ||  || Chile, South American country and location of the European Southern Observatory || 
|-id=637
| 4637 Odorico || 1989 CT || Odorico Mattiussi (1265–1331), Italian Franciscan monk and missionary || 
|-id=638
| 4638 Estens || 1989 EG || John Locke Estens (born 1919), Australian astronomy educator || 
|-id=639
| 4639 Minox ||  || Minox, a miniature camera || 
|-id=640
| 4640 Hara || 1989 GA || Megumi Hara, Japanese amateur astronomer || 
|-id=641
| 4641 Ayako ||  || Ayako Endate (b.~1971) is the wife of Japanese astronomer Kin Endate, who co-discovered this minor planet || 
|-id=642
| 4642 Murchie ||  || Scott L. Murchie (born 1959), of the Applied Physics Laboratory of Johns Hopkins University and contributor to the NEAR Shoemaker mission || 
|-id=643
| 4643 Cisneros ||  || Ernest Cisneros (born 1964), one of the unsung heroes of planetary science. Cisneros began his career as a field geologist but has turned his energies to computer system management, software development, networking and data processing. Throughout the flight portion of the NEAR mission, Ernest insured that key hardware and software elements were developed and implemented. During the flybys of (253) Mathilde and (433) Eros (as well as the earth), Ernest worked with the science team delivering calibrated data within minutes of telemetry arrival for both optical navigation and science analysis. Name proposed by J. Veverka and citation written by M. Robinson. || 
|-id=644
| 4644 Oumu ||  || Ōmu, Hokkaidō, Japan || 
|-id=645
| 4645 Tentaikojo ||  || Astronomical museum at Sapporo, Japan. Meaning "Star Factory" || 
|-id=646
| 4646 Kwee || 4009 P-L || Kiem Keng Kwee (born 1927), a Dutch-Indonesian astronomer at Leiden Observatory, who studies variable stars, using their lightcurves to determine the characteristics of those systems by means of the Wilson-Devinney program. While observing at Palomar in 1963, he co-discovered comet 59P/Kearns–Kwee. || 
|-id=647
| 4647 Syuji ||  || Shuji Hayakawa (born 1958), Japanese astronomer || 
|-id=648
| 4648 Tirion || 1931 UE || Wil Tirion (born 1943), Dutch astronomical cartographer || 
|-id=649
| 4649 Sumoto || 1936 YD || Sumoto, Hyōgo, city in Japan || 
|-id=650
| 4650 Mori || 1950 TF || Kiyoshi Mori, Japanese amateur astronomer || 
|-id=651
| 4651 Wongkwancheng ||  || Kwan-cheng Wong (1907–1986), a leader in Chinese industrial and commercial circles || 
|-id=652
| 4652 Iannini || 1975 QO || Gualberto Mario Iannini (1917–), Argentinean astronomer who has worked in the field of astrometry for almost 40 years. As a student, Iannini studied the orbit of C/1942 C1 (Whipple-Bernasconi-Kulin). In 1962 he joined the faculty of the School of Mathematics, Astronomy and Physics of the National University of Cordoba and became head of the Department of Astrometry of the Cordoba Observatory, where he finished the reduction of the meridian circle catalogue of the Southern Polar Cap, known as the Cordoba E catalogue. || 
|-id=653
| 4653 Tommaso ||  || Tommaso Campanella (1568–1639), Italian monk, philosopher, poet and political figure || 
|-id=654
| 4654 Gorʹkavyj ||  || Nikolaj Nikolaevich Gorʹkavyj (born 1959), staff member of the Crimean Astrophysical Observatory || 
|-id=655
| 4655 Marjoriika || 1978 RS || Marjo Riika Kuusela (born 1964), scholar in Russian literature || 
|-id=656
| 4656 Huchra ||  || John Huchra (1948–2010), an American astronomer and professor of cosmology at Harvard and known for the discovery of the Great Wall || 
|-id=657
| 4657 Lopez ||  || Álvaro López-García (born 1941), professor of astronomy at Valencia University, director of the Valencia University Observatory || 
|-id=658
| 4658 Gavrilov ||  || Aleksej Evgenievich Gavrilov, Ukrainian architect of bridges and director of the "Kievinterproekt" Institute of the International Academy of Architecture; friend of the discoverer, Nikolai Chernykh || 
|-id=659
| 4659 Roddenberry ||  || Eugene Wesley (Gene) Roddenberry, American creator of Star Trek || 
|-id=660
| 4660 Nereus || 1982 DB || Nereus, a Titan. The name was chosen following a competition organized by the Planetary Society || 
|-id=661
| 4661 Yebes || 1982 WM || Yebes, a Spanish village in the Alcarria region, beautifully described by the Spanish Nobel laureate Camilo José Cela in one of his early books. || 
|-id=662
| 4662 Runk || 1984 HL || Ferdinand Runk (1764–1834), German-Austrian landscape painter || 
|-id=663
| 4663 Falta ||  || Josef Falta (1786–1847), an engineer and cartographer of the Schwarzenberg court in Český Krumlov, Czech Republic || 
|-id=664
| 4664 Hanner || 1985 PJ || Martha S. Hanner, American planetary scientist at JPL || 
|-id=665
| 4665 Muinonen ||  || Karri O. Muinonen, Finnish planetary scientist at the Lowell Observatory || 
|-id=666
| 4666 Dietz ||  || Robert S. Dietz (1914–1995), American geologist, pioneering researcher discoverer of terrestrial impact craters || 
|-id=667
| 4667 Robbiesh || 1986 VC || Hans-Christian Robert (Robbie) Wade Schmidt-Harms (born 1986), stepson of the discoverer Robert H. McNaught and son son of Soo Tan (see ) || 
|-id=668
| 4668 Rayjay ||  || Sri Lankan-born and raised Ray Jayawardhana (born 1971), known as "RayJay", an astronomer at the University of Toronto, and an award-winning science writer || 
|-id=669
| 4669 Høder ||  || Høder, Norse god || 
|-id=670
| 4670 Yoshinogawa || 1987 YJ || Yoshino River, Japan || 
|-id=671
| 4671 Drtikol ||  || František Drtikol, Czech photographer || 
|-id=672
| 4672 Takuboku || 1988 HB || Takuboku Ishikawa, Japanese poet || 
|-id=673
| 4673 Bortle || 1988 LF || John E. Bortle, American amateur astronomer || 
|-id=674
| 4674 Pauling || 1989 JC || Linus Carl Pauling, American chemist || 
|-id=675
| 4675 Ohboke || 1990 SD || Oboke Gorge, in Japan. The valleys were formed by the Yoshino River, and are famous for their tinted autumn leaves. || 
|-id=676
| 4676 Uedaseiji ||  || Seiji Ueda, Japanese amateur astronomer || 
|-id=677
| 4677 Hiroshi ||  || Hiroshi Kaneda, Japanese amateur astronomer || 
|-id=678
| 4678 Ninian ||  || Ninian T. McNaught, father of the discoverer Robert H. McNaught || 
|-id=679
| 4679 Sybil ||  || Sybil McNaught, mother of the discoverer Robert H. McNaught || 
|-id=680
| 4680 Lohrmann || 1937 QC || Wilhelm Gotthelf Lohrmann, German geodesist and selenographer || 
|-id=681
| 4681 Ermak ||  || Yermak Timofeyevich, a Cossack who started the Russian conquest of Siberia || 
|-id=682
| 4682 Bykov ||  || Leonid Bykov, Soviet-Ukrainian actor and film director || 
|-id=683
| 4683 Veratar ||  || Vera Petrovna Tarashchuk, an astrophysicist at the Astronomical Observatory of Kiev University || 
|-id=684
| 4684 Bendjoya || 1978 GJ || Philippe Bendjoya, French astronomer at the Nice Observatory in southeast France || 
|-id=685
| 4685 Karetnikov ||  || Valentin Grigor'evich Karetnikov (born 1938), astronomer, professor at Odessa University and director of its observatory || 
|-id=686
| 4686 Maisica ||  || Maria Luisa Grima Garcia, founder and curator of a small home museum in Spain || 
|-id=687
| 4687 Brunsandrej ||  || Andrej Vladimirovich Bruns (born 1931), Soviet astronomer and instrument designer at the Crimean Astrophysical Observatory || 
|-id=689
| 4689 Donn || 1980 YB || Bertram D. Donn, American astronomer || 
|-id=690
| 4690 Strasbourg || 1983 AJ || Strasbourg, France || 
|-id=691
| 4691 Toyen || 1983 TU || Toyen (Marie Čermínová), Czech photographer || 
|-id=692
| 4692 SIMBAD ||  || SIMBAD, the astronomical database at Strasbourg || 
|-id=693
| 4693 Drummond || 1983 WH || Jack D. Drummond, American astronomer at Steward Observatory || 
|-id=694
| 4694 Festou || 1985 PM || Michel C. Festou, French astronomer at Midi-Pyrenees Observatory, Toulouse, France || 
|-id=695
| 4695 Mediolanum ||  || Milan, city in northern Italy and capital of Lombardy (Mediolanum is its Latin name) || 
|-id=696
| 4696 Arpigny || 1985 TP || Claude Arpigny, Belgian astronomer and cometary spectroscopist at the University of Liège || 
|-id=697
| 4697 Novara || 1986 QO || Novara, a city in the Piedmont region in northwest Italy || 
|-id=698
| 4698 Jizera ||  || Jizera River, Czech Republic || 
|-id=699
| 4699 Sootan || 1986 VE || Soo Hoay Tan (born 1956), high-school science teacher and partner of the discoverer Robert H. McNaught || 
|-id=700
| 4700 Carusi ||  || Andrea Carusi, Italian astronomer at the National Institute for Astrophysics (Istituto di Astrofisica Spaziale) || 
|}

4701–4800 

|-
| 4701 Milani ||  || Andrea Milani, Italian astronomer || 
|-id=702
| 4702 Berounka || 1987 HW || Berounka River, Czech Republic || 
|-id=703
| 4703 Kagoshima || 1988 BL || Kagoshima, Kagoshima, Japan || 
|-id=704
| 4704 Sheena ||  || Sheena Fleming Phillips (born 1952), sister of the discoverer Robert H. McNaught || 
|-id=705
| 4705 Secchi || 1988 CK || Angelo Secchi, Italian astronomer and spectroscopist || 
|-id=706
| 4706 Dennisreuter || 1988 DR || Dennis C. Reuter (born 1952), of NASA Goddard Space Flight Center, co-investigator with NASA's Pluto-Kuiper Belt Mission || 
|-id=707
| 4707 Khryses || 1988 PY || Khryses, priest of Apollo || 
|-id=708
| 4708 Polydoros || 1988 RT || Polydorus, Trojan prince || 
|-id=709
| 4709 Ennomos ||  || Ennomos, mythical person related to Trojan War || 
|-id=710
| 4710 Wade ||  || Wade Richard Butler (born 1949), a friend of the discoverer Robert H. McNaught || 
|-id=711
| 4711 Kathy || 1989 KD || Kathleen Garnette Moeller, daughter of the discoverer Henry E. Holt || 
|-id=712
| 4712 Iwaizumi || 1989 QE || Iwaizumi, Iwate, Japan || 
|-id=713
| 4713 Steel || 1989 QL || Duncan Steel (born 1955), British astronomer || 
|-id=714
| 4714 Toyohiro || 1989 SH || Toyohiro Akiyama, Japanese cosmonaut || 
|-id=715
| 4715 Medesicaste ||  || Medesicaste was a daughter of Priam who was married to Imbrius. || 
|-id=716
| 4716 Urey ||  || Harold Urey (1893–1981), American physicist and Nobel laureate || 
|-id=717
| 4717 Kaneko || 1989 WX || Isao Kaneko (1918–), Japanese astronomical educator || 
|-id=718
| 4718 Araki ||  || Chikara Araki (born 1946), Japanese astronomical photographer || 
|-id=719
| 4719 Burnaby ||  || Burnaby, British Columbia, Canada || 
|-id=720
| 4720 Tottori || 1990 YG || Tottori, city in Japan || 
|-id=721
| 4721 Atahualpa || 4239 T-2 || Atahualpa, Inca ruler || 
|-id=722
| 4722 Agelaos || 4271 T-3 || Agelaus, mythical person related to Trojan War || 
|-id=723
| 4723 Wolfgangmattig || 1937 TB || Wolfgang Mattig (born 1927), German solar physicist and cosmologist || 
|-id=724
| 4724 Brocken || 1961 BC || Brocken, mountain in Germany || 
|-id=725
| 4725 Milone || 1975 YE || Eugene Milone, American/Canadian astronomer || 
|-id=726
| 4726 Federer ||  || Charles A. Federer Jr., founder of Sky & Telescope || 
|-id=727
| 4727 Ravel ||  || Joseph-Maurice Ravel, French composer || 
|-id=728
| 4728 Lyapidevskij || 1979 VG || Anatoly Lyapidevsky, Soviet aviator and general || 
|-id=729
| 4729 Mikhailmilʹ ||  || Mikhail Mil (1909–1970), Soviet scientist, aerospace engineer and designer of helicopters || 
|-id=730
| 4730 Xingmingzhou || 1980 XZ || Xing-Ming Zhou (1965–2004), Chinese amateur astronomer || 
|-id=731
| 4731 Monicagrady ||  || Monica Grady, head of petrology and meteoritics at the Natural History Museum in London || 
|-id=732
| 4732 Froeschlé || 1981 JG || Claude and Christiane Froeschlé, French astronomers at Côte d'Azur Observatory || 
|-id=733
| 4733 ORO ||  || Oak Ridge Observatory || 
|-id=734
| 4734 Rameau ||  || Jean-Philippe Rameau, French composer || 
|-id=735
| 4735 Gary || 1983 AN || George Gary Shoemaker, manager of Meteor Crater Enterprises, Inc. || 
|-id=736
| 4736 Johnwood ||  || John A. Wood, American planetary geologist and mineralogist || 
|-id=737
| 4737 Kiladze ||  || Rolan Kiladze (1931–2010), Georgian astronomer || 
|-id=738
| 4738 Jimihendrix ||  || Jimi Hendrix (1942–1970), an American musician || 
|-id=739
| 4739 Tomahrens ||  || Thomas J Ahrens, American geophysicist || 
|-id=740
| 4740 Veniamina ||  || Veniamin Vasil'evich Somov, brother of the discoverer || 
|-id=741
| 4741 Leskov ||  || Nikolay Leskov, Russian short story writer || 
|-id=742
| 4742 Caliumi || 1986 WG || Ferdinando Caliumi (1915–1993), Italian amateur astronomer || 
|-id=743
| 4743 Kikuchi || 1988 DA || Ryoko Kikuchi (born 1964), backup to first Japanese cosmonaut || 
|-id=744
| 4744 Rovereto ||  || Rovereto, City of Peace, is an ancient town in Trentino-Alto Adige (Italy), where the local administration is very active in promoting culture and science || 
|-id=745
| 4745 Nancymarie ||  || Nancy Marie Martinez, daughter of the discoverer Henry E. Holt || 
|-id=746
| 4746 Doi ||  || Takao Doi, backup payload specialist || 
|-id=747
| 4747 Jujo || 1989 WB || Jūjō Paper Industries, Japan || 
|-id=748
| 4748 Tokiwagozen || 1989 WV || Tokiwagozen, mother of Minamoto no Yoshitsune || 
|-id=749
| 4749 Ledzeppelin ||  || Led Zeppelin, a band from the UK whose nine albums (1969–1982) made them one of the most influential acts in rock history || 
|-id=750
| 4750 Mukai ||  || Chiaki Mukai, backup payload specialist || 
|-id=751
| 4751 Alicemanning || 1991 BG || Alice K. Manning, wife of the discoverer || 
|-id=752
| 4752 Myron || 1309 T-2 || Myron of Eleutherae, Ancient Greek (Athenian) sculptor || 
|-id=753
| 4753 Phidias || 4059 T-3 || Phidias, Ancient Greek sculptor || 
|-id=754
| 4754 Panthoos || 5010 T-3 || Panthoos, mythical person related to Trojan War || 
|-id=755
| 4755 Nicky ||  || Nichole Tombaugh, granddaughter of the discoverer Clyde Tombaugh || 
|-id=756
| 4756 Asaramas || 1950 HJ || Asociación Argentina Amigos de la Astronomía, an amateur astronomical association in Argentina || 
|-id=757
| 4757 Liselotte || 1973 ST || Elizabeth Charlotte, Princess of the Palatinate (1652–1722), daughter of Count Palatine Karl Ludwig von der Pfalz || 
|-id=758
| 4758 Hermitage ||  || Hermitage Museum in Saint Petersburg || 
|-id=759
| 4759 Åretta ||  || Åretta, the name of a school situated in the Norwegian town of Lillehammer. The school was one of three winners of the Best School Teaching of Astronomy competition held during the 2009 Year of Astronomy in Norway. || 
|-id=760
| 4760 Jia-xiang ||  || Zhang Jiaxiang (born 1932), Chinese astronomer at the Purple mountain observatory and a discoverer of minor planets || 
|-id=761
| 4761 Urrutia || 1981 QC || Antonio Urrutia A., Chilean lawyer in Santiago || 
|-id=762
| 4762 Dobrynya ||  || Dobrynya Nikitich, Russian epic hero || 
|-id=763
| 4763 Ride || 1983 BM || Sally Ride, American astronaut || 
|-id=764
| 4764 Joneberhart || 1983 CC || Jonathan Eberhart, American science writer for the magazine Science News || 
|-id=765
| 4765 Wasserburg ||  || Gerald J. Wasserburg, American geologist and geophysicist || 
|-id=766
| 4766 Malin ||  || David F. Malin, British-Australian astronomer and photographer || 
|-id=767
| 4767 Sutoku || 1987 GC || Sutoku (1119–1164), the 75th emperor of Japan || 
|-id=768
| 4768 Hartley ||  || Malcolm Hartley (born 1947), British-Australian discoverer of minor planets and comets. He's the deputy astronomer in charge of the UK Schmidt Telescope at Siding Spring Observatory. Among his discoveries are two Amor asteroids and ten comets, including eight with a short period (Src). || 
|-id=769
| 4769 Castalia || 1989 PB || Castalia, Greek nymph || 
|-id=770
| 4770 Lane || 1989 PC || Arthur Lonne Lane, a physical chemist and planetary scientist, manager of the geology and planetary section at the Jet Propulsion Laboratory || 
|-id=771
| 4771 Hayashi ||  || Kohsuke Hayashi, Japanese astronomical educator || 
|-id=772
| 4772 Frankdrake || 1989 VM || Frank Drake (1930–2022) is an American astronomer at the SETI Institute who pioneered the search for extraterrestrial intelligence and conducted the first SETI Search in 1960 || 
|-id=773
| 4773 Hayakawa || 1989 WF || Kazuo Hayakawa (1919–), Japanese mineralogist, petrologist and professor of engineering at Hokkaigakuen University in Sapporo || 
|-id=774
| 4774 Hobetsu ||  || Hobetsu, town in Japan || 
|-id=775
| 4775 Hansen || 1927 TC || Peter Andreas Hansen (1795–1874), Danish–German theoretical astronomer || 
|-id=776
| 4776 Luyi || 1975 VD || Luyi County, China || 
|-id=777
| 4777 Aksenov ||  || Evgenij Petrovich Aksenov (1933–1995), astronomer and director of the Sternberg Astronomical Institute in Moscow || 
|-id=778
| 4778 Fuss ||  || Swiss Nicolas Fuss (1755–1825), Swiss mathematician who contributed to the development of mathematical education in Russia, and his son Pavel Fuss (1798–1855) || 
|-id=779
| 4779 Whitley || 1978 XQ || Keith Whitley (1958–1989), American country music singer || 
|-id=780
| 4780 Polina ||  || Polina Evgen'evna Zakharova, stellar astronomer and director of the Kourovka Astronomical Observatory of the Ural University || 
|-id=781
| 4781 Sládkovič || 1980 TP || Andrej Sládkovič, Slovak poet || 
|-id=782
| 4782 Gembloux ||  || Gembloux, Belgium || 
|-id=783
| 4783 Wasson ||  || John T. Wasson, American cosmochemist and professor at the University of California at Los Angeles || 
|-id=784
| 4784 Samcarin ||  || Samcarin is the Sanskrit word for wanderer || 
|-id=785
| 4785 Petrov ||  || Andrei Pavlovich Petrov, Russian composer || 
|-id=786
| 4786 Tatianina ||  || Tatiana Aleksandrovna Somova, friend of the discoverer Nikolai Chernykh || 
|-id=787
| 4787 Shulʹzhenko ||  || Klavdiya Shulzhenko, Soviet singer of war and popular songs || 
|-id=788
| 4788 Simpson ||  || Robert Simpson (1921–1997), English composer of symphonies and string quartets || 
|-id=789
| 4789 Sprattia ||  || Christopher E. Spratt (born 1942), Canadian amateur astronomer and member of the Royal Astronomical Society of Canada (Src) || 
|-id=790
| 4790 Petrpravec || 1988 PP || Petr Pravec, Czech astronomer || 
|-id=791
| 4791 Iphidamas ||  || Iphidamas, mythical person related to Trojan War || 
|-id=792
| 4792 Lykaon ||  || Lycaon, son of Priam the king of Troy || 
|-id=793
| 4793 Slessor ||  || Mary Slessor (1848–1915), a Scottish missionary to Nigeria || 
|-id=794
| 4794 Bogard ||  || Donald Bogard (born 1940), American meteoriticist at NASA's Johnson Space Center || 
|-id=795
| 4795 Kihara ||  || Hideo Kihara (1911–1993), was a Japanese amateur astronomer and a founder of the Nayoro Astronomical Club || 
|-id=796
| 4796 Lewis || 1989 LU || Joseph Walter Lewis Jr. and Anne Beech Lewis, friends of the discoverer || 
|-id=797
| 4797 Ako || 1989 SJ || Akō, Hyōgo, Japan || 
|-id=798
| 4798 Mercator ||  || Gerardus Mercator (Gerard De Kremer), Flemish cartographer || 
|-id=799
| 4799 Hirasawa ||  || Yasuo Hirasawa, Japanese amateur astronomer || 
|-id=800
| 4800 Veveri ||  || Veveri is a suburb of the Italian town of Novara. It is a crossroad for a historical man-made irrigation system, one of the most important in northern Italy, consisting of the Cavour, Quinto Sella and Regina Elena channels, with the Roggia Mora connection, that supports rice cultivations covering an extended region. || 
|}

4801–4900 

|-
| 4801 Ohře ||  || Ohře River, Czech Republic || 
|-id=802
| 4802 Khatchaturian ||  || Aram Khachaturian (1903–1978), Georgian-Armenian-Russian composer || 
|-id=803
| 4803 Birkle || 1989 XA || Kurt Birkle (1939–2010), German astronomer and discoverer of minor planets || 
|-id=804
| 4804 Pasteur ||  || Louis Pasteur (1822–1895), French chemist and microbiologist || 
|-id=805
| 4805 Asteropaios ||  || Asteropaios, Trojan hero from Greek mythology || 
|-id=806
| 4806 Miho || 1990 YJ || Miho, a town of Shimizu-ku, Shizuoka, Japan || 
|-id=807
| 4807 Noboru || 1991 AO || Noboru Yamada (1950–1989), Japanese alpinist || 
|-id=808
| 4808 Ballaero || 1925 BA || Ball Aerospace and Technology Corporation has contributed to the scientific investigation of minor planets and comets through the development of instruments for the Hubble and Spitzer telescopes, the planned Widefield Infrared Survey Explorer and the spacecraft for the Deep Impact mission to comet 9P/Tempel || 
|-id=809
| 4809 Robertball || 1928 RB || Robert Stawell Ball (1840–1913), a British mathematician and astronomer || 
|-id=810
| 4810 Ruslanova || 1972 GL || Lidia Ruslanova (1900–1973), Russian folk singer || 
|-id=811
| 4811 Semashko ||  || Nikolai Semashko (1874–1949), father of Soviet medicine || 
|-id=812
| 4812 Hakuhou ||  || Hakuhō, Japanese unofficial Era name in lower half of 7th century || 
|-id=813
| 4813 Terebizh ||  || Valerij Yuzefovich Terebizh (born 1941), theoretical astrophysicist and observer at the Crimean station of the Sternberg Astronomical Institute || 
|-id=814
| 4814 Casacci || 1978 RW || Claudio Casacci (born 1958), Italian space scientist and discoverer of minor planets || 
|-id=815
| 4815 Anders ||  || Edward Anders (born 1926), professor emeritus at the University of Chicago, has made many seminal contributions to the field of meteoritics. His work provided early evidence that meteorites are derived from minor planets rather than a larger fragmented planet and that meteoritic organics are of abiotic origin. || 
|-id=816
| 4816 Connelly || 1981 PK || Robert Connelly (born 1942), American mathematician at Cornell University || 
|-id=817
| 4817 Gliba ||  || George Gliba (born 1948), co-founder of the Chagrin Valley Astronomical Society. || 
|-id=818
| 4818 Elgar || 1984 EM || Edward Elgar (1857–1934), British composer || 
|-id=819
| 4819 Gifford || 1985 KC || Charles Gifford (1861–1948) published important papers on the impact origin of lunar craters. He established an observatory at Wellington College, which is now reopening as Gifford Observatory. Mt. Gifford and the Gifford Crack, in Fiordland, are named for his legendary exploits in tramping and photography || 
|-id=820
| 4820 Fay || 1985 RZ || Fay Gillis Wells (1908–2002) an American pioneer aviator, globe-trotting journalist and guiding spirit of the Ninety-Nines, an international organization of women pilots || 
|-id=821
| 4821 Bianucci ||  || Piero Bianucci, Italian science writer || 
|-id=822
| 4822 Karge ||  || Orville B. Karge (1919–1990), American teacher of physics || 
|-id=823
| 4823 Libenice ||  || Libenice, Czech archaeological site || 
|-id=824
| 4824 Stradonice ||  || Stradonice, Czech Republic || 
|-id=825
| 4825 Ventura ||  || Ventura, California || 
|-id=826
| 4826 Wilhelms || 1988 JO || Don E. Wilhelms, American planetary geologist || 
|-id=827
| 4827 Dares || 1988 QE || Dares, mythical person related to Trojan War || 
|-id=828
| 4828 Misenus || 1988 RV || Misenus, mythical Trojan warrior || 
|-id=829
| 4829 Sergestus ||  || Sergestus, mythical Trojan || 
|-id=830
| 4830 Thomascooley ||  || Thomas Benton Cooley, an American hematologist and professor of hygiene and medicine at the University of Michigan and Wayne State University || 
|-id=831
| 4831 Baldwin ||  || Through his pioneering work on the impact origins of lunar craters, Ralph Baldwin (born 1912) recognized the importance of impacts in the moon's geologic history. Baldwin's contributions to lunar science were published in his books The Face of the Moon (1949) and The Measure of the Moon (1963) || 
|-id=832
| 4832 Palinurus ||  || Palinurus, mythical Trojan || 
|-id=833
| 4833 Meges ||  || Mégês Phyleïdês, mythical Greek warrior || 
|-id=834
| 4834 Thoas ||  || Thoas, mythical person related to Trojan War || 
|-id=835
| 4835 Asaeus || 1989 BQ || Asaeus, from Greek mythology. During the Trojan War, he was the first Greek warrior to be slayed by Hector in the battle at the gates of Troy. || 
|-id=836
| 4836 Medon ||  || Medôn, mythical Greek warrior || 
|-id=837
| 4837 Bickerton || 1989 ME || Alexander W. Bickerton (1842–1929), professor of chemistry at Canterbury College, was an inspiring teacher and popularizer of science. Ernest Rutherford was one of his distinguished pupils. Bickerton was known for his "partial impact" theory of novae, which he extended to variable stars and other phenomena. || 
|-id=838
| 4838 Billmclaughlin || 1989 NJ || William I. McLaughlin (born 1935), American astronomer and space scientist formerly of the Jet Propulsion Laboratory || 
|-id=839
| 4839 Daisetsuzan || 1989 QG || Daisetsuzan Volcanic Group, Japan || 
|-id=840
| 4840 Otaynang || 1989 UY || Hanne Otaynang (born 1935), who appealed for the environmental preservation of the earth at the 1992 Earth Summit in Brazil || 
|-id=841
| 4841 Manjiro ||  || Nakahama Manjirō (1827–1898), Japanese traveler || 
|-id=842
| 4842 Atsushi || 1989 WK || Atsushi Takahashi (born 1965), Japanese amateur astronomer and discoverer of minor planets || 
|-id=843
| 4843 Mégantic ||  || Mont Mégantic, observatory in Québec || 
|-id=844
| 4844 Matsuyama ||  || Masanori Matsuyama (born 1950), Japanese amateur astronomer and discoverer of minor planets || 
|-id=845
| 4845 Tsubetsu ||  || The Japanese town of Tsubetsu on the island of Hokkaidō || 
|-id=846
| 4846 Tuthmosis || 6575 P-L || Thutmose, pharaoh || 
|-id=847
| 4847 Amenhotep || 6787 P-L || Amenhotep IV, pharaoh || 
|-id=848
| 4848 Tutenchamun || 3233 T-2 || Tutankhamun, pharaoh || 
|-id=849
| 4849 Ardenne || 1936 QV || Manfred von Ardenne (1907–1997), German inventor and researcher || 
|-id=850
| 4850 Palestrina ||  || Giovanni Pierluigi da Palestrina (c. 1525–1594), Italian composer || 
|-id=851
| 4851 Vodopʹyanova ||  || Galina Petrovna Vodopʹyanova (born 1939), a surgeon of the Russian Academy of Sciences Hospital in St Petersburg || 
|-id=852
| 4852 Pamjones || 1977 JD || Pamela Ann Jones of the Lunar and Planetary Institute in Houston, Texas || 
|-id=853
| 4853 Marielukac || 1979 ML || Marie R. Lukac (born 1947), Staff member, US Naval Observatory || 
|-id=854
| 4854 Edscott ||  || Edward Scott (born 1947), professor at the University of Hawaii || 
|-id=855
| 4855 Tenpyou ||  || Tenpyō, Japanese Era name from 729 through 749 || 
|-id=856
| 4856 Seaborg || 1983 LJ || Glenn T. Seaborg (1912–1999), American atomic scientist || 
|-id=857
| 4857 Altgamia || 1984 FM || Andrew L. T. and Angela Maria Chiarappa Green, son and wife of D. W. E. Green, who was involved in taking the discovery films and who found the identifications for this minor planet || 
|-id=858
| 4858 Vorobjov || 1985 UA || Tomáš Vorobjov (born 1984), Slovak amateur astronomer and discoverer of minor planets || 
|-id=859
| 4859 Fraknoi ||  || Andrew Fraknoi (born 1948), American astronomer and author || 
|-id=860
| 4860 Gubbio || 1987 EP || Gubbio in Italy, site of the iridium anomaly of the K-T extinction boundary || 
|-id=861
| 4861 Nemirovskij ||  || Lev Ruful'evich Nemirovskij (born 1937), Russian engineer || 
|-id=862
| 4862 Loke ||  || Loki (Loke), Norse god of mischief || 
|-id=863
| 4863 Yasutani ||  || Keiki Yasutani (born 1958), Japanese astronomical photographer || 
|-id=864
| 4864 Nimoy ||  || Leonard Nimoy (1931–2015), American actor, film director and poet  || 
|-id=865
| 4865 Sor || 1988 UJ || Fernando Sor (1778–1839), Spanish classical guitar composer || 
|-id=866
| 4866 Badillo ||  || Victor L. Badillo (born 1930), Filipino Jesuit astronomer, former director of the Manila Observatory, president of the Philippine Astronomical Society from 1972 to 1990, and honorary director of the Astronomical League of the Philippines  + || 
|-id=867
| 4867 Polites || 1989 SZ || Polites, prince of Troy and son of king Priam, Greek mythology || 
|-id=868
| 4868 Knushevia ||  || Kyiv (Kiev) National Taras Shevchenko University is the Ukrainian national center of higher education, science and progressive thinking. Since its founding in 1834 the university has played a great role for the development of education, science and culture in the Ukraine || 
|-id=869
| 4869 Piotrovsky ||  || Boris Piotrovsky (1908–1990), Russian orientalist, director of the Hermitage || 
|-id=870
| 4870 Shcherbanʹ ||  || Vladimir Onufrievich Shcherbanʹ (born 1938), Russian engineer || 
|-id=871
| 4871 Riverside ||  || The city of Riverside, California, to celebrate the 35th anniversary of its affiliation with its "sister city" of Sendai, Japan || 
|-id=872
| 4872 Grieg ||  || Edvard Grieg (1843–1907), Norwegian composer || 
|-id=873
| 4873 Fukaya || 1990 EC || Fukaya, Saitama, Japan || 
|-id=874
| 4874 Burke || 1991 AW || James D. Burke, lunar settlement and exploration expert. He is known for being the first program manager of the Ranger Program, and advisor to the Planetary Society || 
|-id=875
| 4875 Ingalls || 1991 DJ || Laura Ingalls Wilder (1867–1957), American author of the "Little House" series, and her family || 
|-id=876
| 4876 Strabo || 1133 T-2 || Strabo, Greek historian and geographer || 
|-id=877
| 4877 Humboldt || 5066 T-2 || Alexander von Humboldt (1769–1859), a Prussian geographer, naturalist and explorer || 
|-id=878
| 4878 Gilhutton || 1968 OF || Ricardo Gil-Hutton (born 1958), Argentine astronomer and dynamicist, specialist in the collisional evolution of minor planets || 
|-id=879
| 4879 Zykina || 1974 VG || Lyudmila Zykina (1929–2009), Soviet singer of folk songs, the favourite singer of Leonid Brezhnev || 
|-id=880
| 4880 Tovstonogov ||  || Georgy Tovstonogov (1915–1989), Russian director, after whom a major theatre in St Petersburg is named || 
|-id=881
| 4881 Robmackintosh || 1975 XJ || Roberto Mackintosh (1971–2012) was the President of the Asociación Argentina Amigos de la Astronomia (2009–2012) and worked to better coordinate amateur and professional activities || 
|-id=882
| 4882 Divari ||  || Nikolaj Borisovich Divari (1921–1993), Ukrainian astronomer and professor at the Odessa Polytechnical Institute || 
|-id=883
| 4883 Korolirina ||  || Irina Leonidovna Korol', a friend of the discoverer Nikolai Chernykh || 
|-id=884
| 4884 Bragaria ||  || Luka Fedorovich Bragar' (born 1938), a senior lecturer on the staff of Tiraspol Pedagogical Institute (Moldova). || 
|-id=885
| 4885 Grange || 1980 LU || Alice Shoemaker Grange (born 1908), aunt of Eugene Shoemaker || 
|-id=886
| 4886 Kojima ||  || Hideyasu Kojima (born 1951), the curator of the Japanese Antarctic meteorite collection at the National Institute of Polar Research in Tokyo. || 
|-id=887
| 4887 Takihiroi ||  || Takahiro (Taki) Hiroi (born 1960), a researcher in the department of geological sciences at Brown University. || 
|-id=888
| 4888 Doreen ||  || Doreen Vingness Spellmann, sister-in-law of the discoverer Carolyn Shoemaker || 
|-id=889
| 4889 Praetorius ||  || Michael Praetorius (1571–1621), German composer || 
|-id=890
| 4890 Shikanosima ||  || Shikanosima, island in Japan || 
|-id=891
| 4891 Blaga || 1984 GR || Blaga Dimitrova, Bulgarian poetess, novelist and translator || 
|-id=892
| 4892 Chrispollas ||  || Christian Pollas (born 1947), a French astronomer and discoverer of minor planets || 
|-id=893
| 4893 Seitter ||  || Waltraut Seitter, German astronomer || 
|-id=894
| 4894 Ask || 1986 RJ || Ask, the first man, in Norse mythology || 
|-id=895
| 4895 Embla ||  || Embla, the first woman, in Norse mythology || 
|-id=896
| 4896 Tomoegozen || 1986 YA || Tomoe Gozen (c. 1157–1247), Japanese female samurai || 
|-id=897
| 4897 Tomhamilton || 1987 QD6 || Thomas William Hamilton (born 1939) determined radar and fuel requirements for the Apollo Project. Later he wrote shows (in a dozen languages and also for the deaf) for programmable planetaria, taught astronomy for 32 years and trained students to enter the planetarium field (see list of his books). || 
|-id=898
| 4898 Nishiizumi || 1988 FJ || Kunihiko Nishiizumi, Japanese nuclear chemist at the University of California at Berkeley || 
|-id=899
| 4899 Candace || 1988 JU || Candace P. Kohl, American chemist and investigator of ancient solar activity || 
|-id=900
| 4900 Maymelou || 1988 ME || Mayme Lou "Stevey" Stevens Bruce, together with her husband, wrote books about their travels, enthusiastic supporter and spokesperson for solar system research || 
|}

4901–5000 

|-
| 4901 Ó Briain || 1988 VJ || Dara Ó Briain (born 1972), Irish comedian || 
|-id=902
| 4902 Thessandrus ||  || Thessandrus, mythical person related to Trojan War || 
|-id=903
| 4903 Ichikawa || 1989 UD || Kiyotaka (or Seikou) Ichikawa, Japanese amateur astronomer || 
|-id=904
| 4904 Makio || 1989 WZ || Makio Akiyama (born 1950), Japanese astronomer and discoverer of minor planets || 
|-id=905
| 4905 Hiromi ||  || Hiromi Takahashi, wife of one of the discoverers || 
|-id=906
| 4906 Seneferu || 2533 P-L || Sneferu (c. 2613–2589 BC), ancient Egyptian king, founder of the 4th dynasty and builder of pyramids || 
|-id=907
| 4907 Zoser || 7618 P-L || Djoser (Zoser) ancient Egyptian pharaoh of the 3rd dynasty (2630 BC – 2611 BC) || 
|-id=908
| 4908 Ward || 1933 SD || Steven Ward, electronics technician at the Harvard-Smithsonian Center for Astrophysics || 
|-id=909
| 4909 Couteau ||  || Paul Couteau, French astronomer and observer of double-stars at Nice Observatory || 
|-id=910
| 4910 Kawasato || 1953 PR || Nobuhiro Kawasato, Japanese amateur astronomer and discoverer of minor planets || 
|-id=911
| 4911 Rosenzweig || 1953 UD || Jack Rosenzweig (1919–1994) and  Marcelle Rosenzweig (1929–) "Pioneers of the Zone" in Puerto Ordaz, Venezuela || 
|-id=912
| 4912 Emilhaury ||  || Emil Haury (1904–1992), American archaeologist || 
|-id=913
| 4913 Wangxuan || 1965 SO || Wang Xuan (1937–2006), Chinese computer scientist || 
|-id=914
| 4914 Pardina || 1969 GD || Elsa Gutierrez Rodriguez-Pardina (born 1921), Argentinian astronomer at the La Plata Observatory in Argentina || 
|-id=915
| 4915 Solzhenitsyn ||  || Aleksandr Solzhenitsyn (1918–2008), Russian writer and critic of the Soviet Union and communism || 
|-id=916
| 4916 Brumberg || 1970 PS || Victor A. Brumberg (born 1933), Russian astronomer and former staff member at the Institute of Theoretical Astronomy || 
|-id=917
| 4917 Yurilvovia ||  || Yurij Alekseevich L'vov (1932–1994), deputy director of the Institute of Biology and Biophysics at the Tomsk State University || 
|-id=918
| 4918 Rostropovich ||  || Mstislav Rostropovich (1927–2007), a Russian cellist and conductor || 
|-id=919
| 4919 Vishnevskaya ||  || Galina Vishnevskaya (1926–2012), Russian opera singer, wife of Mstislav Rostropovich (see above) || 
|-id=920
| 4920 Gromov ||  || Mikhail Gromov (1899–1985), Russian aviator who set the world record for long-distance flight in 1934 || 
|-id=921
| 4921 Volonté || 1980 SJ || Gian Maria Volonté (1933–1994), Italian actor || 
|-id=922
| 4922 Leshin ||  || Laurie A. Leshin (born 1965), a planetary geologist and director of Sciences and Exploration at Goddard Space Flight Center || 
|-id=923
| 4923 Clarke ||  || Arthur C. Clarke (1917–2008), British-Sri Lankan science fiction author || 
|-id=924
| 4924 Hiltner ||  || W. Albert Hiltner (1914–1991), American astronomer || 
|-id=925
| 4925 Zhoushan ||  || City of Zhoushan, in east China || 
|-id=926
| 4926 Smoktunovskij ||  || Innokenty Smoktunovsky (1925–1994), Russian actor || 
|-id=927
| 4927 O'Connell ||  || Daniel O'Connell (1775–1847), Irish politician || 
|-id=928
| 4928 Vermeer ||  || Johannes Vermeer (1632–1675), Dutch painter || 
|-id=929
| 4929 Yamatai || 1982 XV || Yamataikoku (Yamatai), region of ancient Japan || 
|-id=930
| 4930 Rephiltim ||  || Rebecca Salyards (born 1988), Philip Salyards (born 1991) and Timothy Salyards (born 1995), children of American astronomer Stephen L. Salyards who discovered this minor planet || 
|-id=931
| 4931 Tomsk ||  || Siberian city of Tomsk, Russia || 
|-id=932
| 4932 Texstapa ||  || Texas Star Party, amateur astronomy gathering || 
|-id=933
| 4933 Tylerlinder ||  || Tyler Linder (born 1986), an assiduous observer of minor planets at the Astronomical Research Institute || 
|-id=934
| 4934 Rhôneranger || 1985 JJ || Randall Graham, wine producer || 
|-id=935
| 4935 Maslachkova ||  || Iya Mikhailovna Maslachkova (1937–1996), Russian poet and teacher from St. Petersburg || 
|-id=936
| 4936 Butakov ||  || Grigory Butakov (1820–1882), Russian admiral || 
|-id=937
| 4937 Lintott ||  || Chris Lintott (born 1980), British astronomer and public educator, co-presenter since 2004 of the long-standing BBC monthly television program The Sky at Night || 
|-id=938
| 4938 Papadopoulos ||  || Christos Papadopoulos (1910–1992), a Johannesburg-based South African astrophotographer and star atlas compiler, published his three-volume True Visual Magnitude Photographic Star Atlas in 1979. || 
|-id=939
| 4939 Scovil ||  || Charles E. Scovil (born 1928), an amateur astronomer and curator of the Stamford Observatory in Connecticut, United States || 
|-id=940
| 4940 Polenov ||  || Vasily Polenov (1844–1927), Russian landscape painter || 
|-id=941
| 4941 Yahagi || 1986 UA || Yahagi River, a river flows through Aichi, hometown of the discoverers || 
|-id=942
| 4942 Munroe ||  || Randall Munroe (born 1984) is a former NASA roboticist and the author of xkcd, a popular webcomic various themes including science, mathematics technology and computer science || 
|-id=943
| 4943 Lac d'Orient || 1987 OQ || Man-made lake in the Orient Forest Regional Natural Park (Lac de la Forêt d'Orient) in northern France || 
|-id=944
| 4944 Kozlovskij ||  || Ivan Kozlovsky (1900–1993), Russian opera singer || 
|-id=945
| 4945 Ikenozenni || 1987 SJ || Ikenozenni, second wife of Taira no Tadamori (1096–1153), Japanese samurai || 
|-id=946
| 4946 Askalaphus ||  || Askalaphus (Ascalaphus), son of Ares, brother of Ialmenus, participant in the Trojan War || 
|-id=947
| 4947 Ninkasi ||  || Ninkasi, Sumerian goddess of wine and beer || 
|-id=948
| 4948 Hideonishimura ||  || Hideo Nishimura (born 1949) observer of comets and discoverer of C/1994 N1 (Nakamura-Nishimura-Machholz) in 1965 || 
|-id=949
| 4949 Akasofu || 1988 WE || Syun-Ichi Akasofu (born 1930), Japanese professor of geophysics since 1964 at the University of Fairbanks, Alaska, where he served as director of the International Arctic Research Center (1998–2007) and his auroral work received national and international recognition || 
|-id=950
| 4950 House ||  || R. C. House, novelist and journalist and editor of JPL's Universe || 
|-id=951
| 4951 Iwamoto || 1990 BM || Masayuki Iwamoto (born 1954), Japanese amateur astronomer and discoverer of minor planets || 
|-id=952
| 4952 Kibeshigemaro ||  || Shigemaro Kibe (1912–1990), Japanese amateur telescope maker and an observer of the Sun, planets and variable stars || 
|-id=954
| 4954 Eric || 1990 SQ || Ancient Norse name, used for Scandinavian monarchs such as Erik the Red (c. 950–1003) and his son Leif Erikson (c. 970–1020), Eric IX (c. 1156–1160) king of Sweden, and Eric of Pomerania (1381–1459) king of Denmark, Norway and Sweden. Also named for Eric Dale Roman, son of discoverer Brian P. Roman || 
|-id=955
| 4955 Gold ||  || Robert E. Gold (born 1943), of the Applied Physics Laboratory of Johns Hopkins University and contributor to the NEAR Shoemaker mission || 
|-id=956
| 4956 Noymer ||  || Andrew J. Noymer (born 1971), American astronomer and discoverer of minor planets || 
|-id=957
| 4957 Brucemurray || 1990 XJ || Bruce C. Murray (1931–2013), American planetary scientist, co-founder with Carl Sagan of the Planetary Society || 
|-id=958
| 4958 Wellnitz ||  || Dennis D. Wellnitz (born 1951), American physicist, observer and instrument builder at the University of Maryland || 
|-id=959
| 4959 Niinoama ||  || Taira no Tokiko (1126–1185), second wife of Taira no Kiyomori || 
|-id=960
| 4960 Mayo || 4657 P-L || Mayo Greenberg (1922–2001), American-Dutch astrochemist and expert on cometary structure and composition † || 
|-id=961
| 4961 Timherder ||  || Timothy Scott Herder (born 1955), American the deputy project manager of NASA's New Horizons-Pluto Kuiper Belt mission. As such, he has helped further the exploration of the planets. || 
|-id=962
| 4962 Vecherka || 1973 TP || Vechernij Peterburg, newspaper in St. Petersburg, Russia, that frequently publishes astronomical information || 
|-id=963
| 4963 Kanroku ||  || Kanroku (Gwalleuk), a 7th-century Korean Buddhist monk || 
|-id=964
| 4964 Kourovka ||  || Kourovka astronomical observatory, near Kourovka, Russia || 
|-id=965
| 4965 Takeda ||  || Hiroshi Takeda (born 1934), Japanese meteologist || 
|-id=966
| 4966 Edolsen ||  || Edward John Olsen (1927–), American meteoriticist || 
|-id=967
| 4967 Glia ||  || Latin for "glue". Glial cells provide support and protection for neurons in the central and peripheral nervous systems || 
|-id=968
| 4968 Suzamur || 1986 PQ || Suzanne Moss Murray, friend of American astronomer Eleanor Helin who discovered this minor planet || 
|-id=969
| 4969 Lawrence || 1986 TU || Kenneth J. Lawrence  (born 1964), American astronomer, participant in Palomar Planet-Crossing Asteroid Survey, and a discoverer of minor planets || 
|-id=970
| 4970 Druyan ||  || Ann Druyan (born 1949), American author and producer, wife of Carl Sagan || 
|-id=971
| 4971 Hoshinohiroba || 1989 BY || Hoshinohiroba, Comet Observers Network in Japan || 
|-id=972
| 4972 Pachelbel ||  || Johann Pachelbel (1653–1706), German composer and organist || 
|-id=973
| 4973 Showa || 1990 FT || Manufacturer of telescopes in Japan || 
|-id=974
| 4974 Elford || 1990 LA || W. Graham Elford (1926–), Australian astronomer, radar meteor researcher at the University of Adelaide and former president of IAU Commission 22 || 
|-id=975
| 4975 Dohmoto ||  || Yoshio Dohmoto (1914- ), Japanese astronomer who directed the Asahikawa Observatory in Hokkaido || 
|-id=976
| 4976 Choukyongchol || 1991 PM || Cho Gyeong-chul (1929–2010), Korean astronomer || 
|-id=977
| 4977 Rauthgundis || 2018 P-L || Rauthgundis Seitz, friend of the discoverers || 
|-id=978
| 4978 Seitz || 4069 T-2 || Horstmar Seitz, friend of one of the discoverers || 
|-id=979
| 4979 Otawara || 1949 PQ || Akira Otawara (born 1950), Japanese photo artist and writer || 
|-id=980
| 4980 Magomaev ||  || Muslim Magomayev (1942–2008), a Soviet crooner and opera singer || 
|-id=981
| 4981 Sinyavskaya || 1974 VS || Tamara Sinyavskaya (born 1943), Soviet opera singer, wife of Muslim Magomayev (see above) || 
|-id=982
| 4982 Bartini ||  || Robert Ludvigovich Bartini (1897–1974), an Italian aircraft designer and researcher in aerodynamics, theoretical physics and cosmology. Active mostly in the Soviet Union, he was called "Barone Rosso" because of his noble descent. || 
|-id=983
| 4983 Schroeteria ||  || Johann Hieronymus Schröter (1745–1816), German astronomer || 
|-id=984
| 4984 Patrickmiller ||  || Patrick J. Miller (born 1949), professor of mathematics at Hardin-Simmons University in Abilene, TX || 
|-id=985
| 4985 Fitzsimmons ||  || Alan Fitzsimmons (DOB n.a.), a British astronomer, professor of astronomy and a discoverer of minor planets (Src) || 
|-id=986
| 4986 Osipovia ||  || Valery Ivanovich Osipov, Russian historian, archaeologist and linguist || 
|-id=987
| 4987 Flamsteed ||  || John Flamsteed (1646–1719), first Astronomer Royal of England, known for the Flamsteed designation used in his star catalog Historia Coelestis Britannica || 
|-id=988
| 4988 Chushuho ||  || Chu, Shu Ho David, Hong Kong physical educator, promoter of the 2008 Olympic Games in Beijing || 
|-id=989
| 4989 Joegoldstein ||  || Joseph I. Goldstein (1939–2015), American meteoriticist || 
|-id=990
| 4990 Trombka ||  || Jacob Israel Trombka (born 1930), American physicist at NASA's Goddard Space Flight Center || 
|-id=991
| 4991 Hansuess ||  || Hans Suess (1909–1993), Austrian-born American geochemist || 
|-id=992
| 4992 Kálmán ||  || Emmerich Kálmán (1882–1953), Hungarian composer of operettas || 
|-id=993
| 4993 Cossard || 1983 GR || Guido Cossard (born 1958), Italian archaeoastronomer || 
|-id=994
| 4994 Kisala ||  || Rachel Kisala (born 1985), Physics and Astronomy Major, worked for Dr. Brian Marsden at the Minor Planet Center || 
|-id=995
| 4995 Griffin || 1984 QR || Griffin Swanson, son of the discoverer || 
|-id=996
| 4996 Veisberg ||  || Vladimir Grigoryevich Weisberg (1924–1985), Russian painter || 
|-id=997
| 4997 Ksana || 1986 TM || Kseniya Andréevna Nessler, friend of Soviet astronomer Lyudmila Karachkina who discovered this minor planet || 
|-id=998
| 4998 Kabashima || 1986 VG || Fujio Kabashima (born 1939), Japanese amateur astronomer || 
|-id=999
| 4999 MPC || 1987 CJ || Minor Planet Circulars, astrometric observations published by the Minor Planet Center || 
|-id=000
| 5000 IAU ||  || International Astronomical Union || 
|}

References 

004001-005000